= 1940–41 American Soccer League =

Statistics of American Soccer League II in season 1940–41.

== Metropolitan Division ==
American Soccer League Metropolitan Division
- Season: 1940–41
- Champions: Scots-Americans
- Top goalscorer: Fabri Salcedo (17)
- All statistics correct as of August 2, 2019.

Pos	Team	Pld	W	L	D	GF	GA	Pts	PCT
1	Scots-Americans	23	16	5	2	71	39	34	.739
2	Philadelphia German-American	22	14	4	4	59	33	32	.727
3	Baltimore S.C.	21	11	5	5	45	30	27	.643
4	Brookhattan	23	11	6	6	52	37	28	.609
5	Brooklyn Hispano	21	9	6	6	68	62	24	.571
6	New York Americans	23	9	8	6	48	41	24	.522
7	Passon Phillies	21	8	9	4	40	50	20	.476
8	St. Mary's Celtic	20	7	10	3	49	50	17	.425
9	Baltimore Americans	21	6	13	2	42	67	14	.333
10	Irish-Americans	22	4	14	4	40	55	12	.273
11	Paterson F.C.	17	1	16	0	30	80	2	.059

== New England Division ==
American Soccer League New England Division
- Season: 1940–41
- Champions: Fall River S.C.
- All statistics correct as of August 2, 2019.

=== First half ===
Pos	Team	Pld	W	L	D	GF	GA	Pts
1	Fall River S.C.	12	11	1	0	44	8	22
2	Pawtucket S.C.	12	10	1	1	55	15	21
3	Gremio Lusitano	12	6	4	2	36	25	14
4	Lusitania Recreation	12	4	7	1	26	30	9
5	Scandinavians (Note: The Scandinavians and Swedish-Americans played their final first half game on April 20, 1941.)	12	4	7	1	26	51	9
6	Boston Celtics	12	2	8	2	20	43	6
7	Swedish-Americans	12	0	9	3	13	48	3

=== Second half ===
Pos	Team	Pld	W	L	D	GF	GA	Pts
1	Pawtucket S.C.	10	7	1	2	39	15	16
2	Fall River S.C.	8	6	1	1	33	13	13
3	Swedish-Americans	8	4	2	2	18	13	10
4	Lusitania Recreation	10	4	4	2	25	34	10
5	Gremio Lusitano	7	1	4	2	24	22	4
6	Scandinavians	9	1	6	2	17	40	4
7	Boston Celtics	8	1	6	1	15	34	3

=== Playoffs ===
June 8, 1941

Fall River S.C.	4–2	Pawtucket S.C.
Joe Chapiga, Joe Rego,		Walter Dick; Valentine

Fall River Stadium, Fall River, Massachusetts
Referee: C. Gizzi

June 15, 1941

Pawtucket S.C.	1–2	Fall River S.C.
Frank Moniz		Joe Rego,

Coats Field, Pawtucket, Rhode Island
Referee: P. Turner

Fall River wins, 6-3, on aggregate.
