= 1936–37 American Soccer League =

Statistics of American Soccer League II in season 1936–37.

== Metropolitan Division ==
American Soccer League Metropolitan Division
- Season: 1936–37
- Champions: Scots-Americans
- Premiers: Brooklyn Hispano
- Top goalscorer: Charlie Ernst (25)
- All statistics correct as of August 2, 2019.

National Division
Team	Pld	W	T	L	Pts
St. Mary's Celtic	22	11	4	7	26
Scots-Americans	22	8	8	6	24
Paterson Caledonian	22	9	3	10	21
Passon Phillies	22	6	5	11	17
New York Americans	22	4	7	11	15

American Division
Team	Pld	W	T	L	Pts
Brooklyn Hispano	22	14	2	6	30
Baltimore S.C.	22	12	3	7	27
Philadelphia German American	22	8	8	6	24
Irish-Americans	22	8	4	10	20
Brookhattan	22	5	6	11	16

=== Playoffs ===
==== First round ====
- Kearny Scots defeated Baltimore 3–1
- Paterson defeated Philadelphia Passon, 6–2

==== Semifinals ====
- Brooklyn Hispano defeated Brooklyn St. Mary's, 4–3, 3–2
- Kearny Scots defeated Paterson 3–2

==== Championship finals ====
- Kearny Scots defeated Brooklyn Hispano 5–3, 3–3. Aggregate: 8–6

== New England Division ==
American Soccer League New England Division
- Season: 1936–37
- Champions: Providence S.C.
- All statistics correct as of August 2, 2019.

=== First half ===
Pos	Team	Pld	W	L	T	GF	GA	Pts	PCT
1	Providence S.C.	15	11	2	2	38	18	24	.800
2	Thornton Victorias	13	7	3	3	23	16	17 (Note: Thornton and Moore's had a match scheduled on February 28. Unknown if it was played.)	.654
3	St. Michael's (Note: The Fall River Rovers played two games to open the season. The next week Moore's joined the league and played "newcomers Fall River St. Michael's". The Rovers' loss and draw were included in St. Michael's official standings.)	15	9	5	1	35	19	19	.633
4	Lusitania Recreation	14	7	5	2	32	19	16	.571
5	Boston Celts	15	6	4	5	23	25	17	.567
6	Swedish-Americans	15	6	8	1	38	41	13	.433
7	Fall River Americans (Note: Fall River United joined the league but were named Fall River Americans when the season started.)	14	3	8	3	35	41	9 (Note: One loss likely missing from standings. Should probably be 15 GP, 3-9-3 WLD & .300 Pct.)	.321
8	Moore's	13	2	7	4	21	37	8	.308
9	Pawtucket F.C.	16	3	11	2	31	53	8	.250

=== Second half ===
Pos	Team	Pld	W	L	T	GF	GA	Pts	PCT
1	Providence S.C.	11	9	0	2	41	11	20	.909
2	Swedish-Americans	11	7	4	0	25	14	14 (Note: Swedes and Boston played two games after May 24 standings. Swedes won both games: 2-1 on June 6 and 4-2 on June 13. These results are included in these standings.)	.636
3	Lusitania Recreation	11	7	4	0	22	14	14	.636
4	St.Michael's	9	5	4	0	27	32	10 (Note: St. Michael's not included in the May 17 and May 24 standings. Last game played on May 9.)	.556
5	Boston Celts	12	5	6	1	28	29	11	.458
6	Thornton Victorias	11	3	4	4	15	18	10	.455
7	Moore's	8	2	5	1	13	30	5	.313
8	Pawtucket F.C.	10	2	8	0	18	28	4	.200
9	Fall River Americans	11	1	8	2	20	33	4	.182
