= 1939–40 National Challenge Cup =

Football cup championship in the United States

- Dewar Challenge Cup

Tournament details
- Country: United States
- Dates: 5 November 1939 – 12 May 1940

Final positions
- Champions: Baltimore S.C. Sparta Fallstaff (title shared)
- Semifinalists: Morgan Sport Club; Brookhattan

The 1939–40 National Challenge Cup was the 27th edition of the United States Football Association's annual open cup. Today, the tournament is known as the U.S. Open Cup. Teams from the American Soccer League II competed in the tournament, based on qualification methods in their base region.

The tournament was unique in that it is the only edition not to produce an overall winner. After their two matches both ended as draws, 0-0 and 2-2, Baltimore S.C. and Sparta Fallstaff shared the title.

== Eastern Bracket ==
Numbers in parentheses next to the match score represent the results of a replay.

First Round
November 12, 1939
(New Jersey) Scots-Americans	9
(Pennsylvania) Allentown S.C.	0
November 19, 1939
(New Jersey) Paterson F.C.	4
(New Jersey) Irish-Americans	0
November 12, 1939
(New York (state)) St. Mary's Celtic	2
(New York (state)) Brooklyn Hispano	0
November 12, 1939
(New York (state)) Norwegian Americans	2
(New York (state)) New York Kollsman	1
November 12, 1939
(Pennsylvania) Philadelphia German-American	4
(Pennsylvania) Reading German	0
November 19, 1939
(Pennsylvania) Passon Phillies	1
(Pennsylvania) Philadelphia Americans	0
November 12, 1939
(Maryland) Baltimore S.C.	10
(Maryland) St. Gerard's	1
November 19, 1939
(Maryland) Baltimore Americans	2
(Pennsylvania) Kensington Blue Bells (a.e.t.)	4
November 5, 1939
(Massachusetts) Lusitania Recreation	3
(Massachusetts) Ludlow Lusitano	1
November 18, 1939
(Massachusetts) Holy Cross S.C.	0
(Rhode Island) Pawtucket S.C.	2
November 19, 1939
(Massachusetts) Fall River Firestones	Win
(Massachusetts) Baylies	Loss
November 5, 1939 (November 12, 1939)^{1}
(Massachusetts) St. Michael's	2 (2)
(New Jersey) Newark Portuguese	0 (1)
November 19, 1939
(New York (state)) Brookhattan	3
(New York (state)) Galicia F.C.	0
November 12, 1939
(New York (state)) Swedish F.C.	2
(New York (state)) Hatikvoh F.C.	1
November 12, 1939
(New York (state)) New York Americans	3
(New York (state)) German-Hungarian Sports Club	0
November 12, 1939
(New York (state)) Gjoa S.C.	3
(New York (state)) Brooklyn Germans	1

Second Round
December 3, 1939
(New Jersey) Scots-Americans	3
(New Jersey) Paterson F.C.	2
December 4, 1939
(New York (state)) St. Mary's Celtic	1
(New York (state)) Norwegian Americans	0
December 10, 1939 (December 16, 1939)
(Pennsylvania) Philadelphia German-American (a.e.t.)^{2}	2 (4)
(Pennsylvania) Passon Phillies	2 (2)
December 4, 1939
(Maryland) Baltimore S.C.	5
(Pennsylvania) Kensington Blue Bells	1
December 3, 1939
(Massachusetts) Lusitania Recreation	4
(Rhode Island) Pawtucket S.C.	1
December 10, 1939
(Massachusetts) Fall River Firestones	3
(Massachusetts) St. Michael's	0
December 3, 1939
(New York (state)) Brookhattan	2
(New York (state)) Swedish F.C.	1
December 10, 1939
(New York (state)) New York Americans	1
(New York (state)) Gjoa S.C.	0

Quarterfinals
January 1, 1940
(New Jersey) Scots-Americans	3
(New York (state)) St. Mary's Celtic (a.e.t.)	4
January 1, 1940
(Pennsylvania) Philadelphia German-American	1
(Maryland) Baltimore S.C.	4
January 1, 1940 (January 6, 1940)
(Massachusetts) Lusitania Recreation	2 (5)
(Massachusetts) Fall River Firestones	2 (2)
January 1, 1940 (January 21, 1940)
(New York (state)) Brookhattan	1 (1)
(New York (state)) New York Americans	1 (0)

Semifinals
March 17, 1940
(New York (state)) St. Mary's Celtic	2
(Maryland) Baltimore S.C.	3
March 17, 1940
(Massachusetts) Lusitania Recreation	2
(New York (state)) Brookhattan	2

Final
April 13 & 15, 1940
(Maryland) Baltimore S.C.	3–2
(New York (state)) Brookhattan	1–2

^{1} First match was abandoned after 35 minutes due to rain
^{2} Replay went to extra time

== Western Bracket ==
Numbers in parentheses next to the match score represent the results of a replay.

First Round
November 5, 1939
(Illinois) Sparta Fallstaff	4
(Illinois) Chicago Olympia	0
(Illinois) Chicago Manhattan Beer	Bye
November 5, 1939 (November 12, 1939)
(Illinois) Chicago Viking	1 (1)
(Illinois) Chicago Swedish American	1 (3)
November 5, 1939 (November 12, 1939)
(Wisconsin) Milwaukee Hungarian	3 (5)
(Wisconsin) Milwaukee Schlitz	3 (4)
(Michigan) Detroit Chrysler	Bye
(Michigan) Detroit Celtic	Bye
November 12, 1939
(Ohio) Bartunek Slavia	7
(Pennsylvania) Dunlevy	2
November 5, 1939
(Ohio) Cleveland Shamrocks	3
(Ohio) Cleveland Dalarda	1
November 5, 1939
(Pennsylvania) Morgan Sport Club	1
(Pennsylvania) Cuddy	0
November 5, 1939
(Pennsylvania) Glendale	3
(Pennsylvania) Muse	0
November 5, 1939
(New York (state)) Becks German American (a.e.t.)	9
(New York (state)) Rochester German	5
November 5, 1939
(New York (state)) Buffalo City Hungarian	3
(New York (state)) Niagara Falls MacKenzie	1
November 5, 1939
(Pennsylvania) Harmarville	1
(Pennsylvania) Heidelberg	6
November 5, 1939
(Pennsylvania) Curry	2
(Pennsylvania) Castle Shannon	4
(New York (state)) Rochester Thistles	Bye
November 5, 1939
(Pennsylvania) Canonsburg	2
(Pennsylvania) Gallatin	0

Second Round
December 3, 1939
(Illinois) Sparta Fallstaff	2
(Illinois) Chicago Manhattan Beer	0
December 3, 1939
(Illinois) Chicago Swedish American	7
(Wisconsin) Milwaukee Hungarian	0
December 10, 1939
(Michigan) Detroit Chrysler	3
(Michigan) Detroit Celtic	1
December 24, 1939
(Ohio) Bartunek Slavia	0
(Ohio) Cleveland Shamrocks	2
December 10, 1939 (Dec. 17/25/31, 1939)
(Pennsylvania) Morgan Sport Club (a.e.t.)^{1}	3 (0) (2)^{2} (5)
(Pennsylvania) Glendale	3 (0) (0)^{2} (0)
December 10, 1939
(New York (state)) Becks German American	4
(New York (state)) Buffalo City Hungarian	2
December 3, 1939
(Pennsylvania) Heidelberg	2
(Pennsylvania) Castle Shannon	1
December 3, 1939
(New York (state)) Rochester Thistles	1
(Pennsylvania) Canonsburg	6

Quarterfinals
December 17, 1939
(Illinois) Sparta Fallstaff	2
(Illinois) Chicago Swedish American	0
December 24, 1939
(Michigan) Detroit Chrysler	3
(Ohio) Cleveland Shamrocks	0
January 14, 1940
(Pennsylvania) Morgan Sport Club	8
(New York (state)) Becks German American	1
January 1, 1940
(Pennsylvania) Heidelberg	Win
(Pennsylvania) Canonsburg	Loss

Semifinals
March 17, 1940
(Illinois) Sparta Fallstaff	1
(Michigan) Detroit Chrysler	0
March 17, 1940
(Pennsylvania) Morgan Sport Club	2
(Pennsylvania) Heidelberg	0

Final
April 7 & 14, 1940 (April 21, 1940)
(Illinois) Sparta Fallstaff (a.e.t.)^{3}	1–1 (1)
(Pennsylvania) Morgan Sport Club	1–1 (0)

^{1} First and second match went into extra time
^{2} Third match had to be abandoned in the 70th minute due to crowd trouble
^{3} Second match went into extra time
