= 1937–38 American Soccer League =

Statistics of American Soccer League II in season 1937–38.

== Metropolitan Division ==
American Soccer League Metropolitan Division
- Season: 1937–38
- Champions: Scots-Americans
- Premiers: Philadelphia German-American
- Top goalscorer: Fabri Salcedo (17)
- All statistics correct as of August 2, 2019.

National Division
Team	Pld	W	D	L	GF	GA	Pts
Scots-Americans	18	8	4	6	38	39	20
St. Mary's Celtic	18	8	1	9	34	42	17
New York Americans	18	6	3	9	31	31	15
Passon Phillies	18	5	5	8	39	40	15
Paterson Caledonians	18	6	2	10	28	39	14

American Division
Team	Pld	W	D	L	GF	GA	Pts
Philadelphia German-American	18	11	3	4	38	28	25
Brookhattan	18	10	3	5	46	41	23
Kearny Irish	18	8	4	6	32	27	20
Baltimore S.C.	18	7	3	8	32	32	17
Brooklyn Hispano	18	6	2	10	48	60	14

=== Playoffs ===
==== Bracket ====
First round (2-match aggregate)
N1	Scots-Americans	-	-	-
(first round bye)	-	-	-
A1	Philadelphia German-Americans	-	-	-
(first round bye)	-	-	-
A2	New York Brookhattan	2	0	2
N2	St. Mary's Celtic	3	1	4
A3	Kearny Irish	3	5	8
N3	New York Americans	1	4	5

Semifinals (2-match aggregate)
N1	Scots-Americans	4	8	12
A1	Philadelphia German-Americans	2	4	6
N2	St. Mary's Celtic	1	2	3
A3	Kearny Irish	0	1	1

ASL Championship Finals (2-match aggregate)
N1	Scots-Americans	4	2	6
N2	St. Mary's Celtic	2	2	4

==== First round ====
Higher Seed	Aggregate	Lower Seed	First leg	Second leg	Attendance
New York Brookhattan	2–4	St. Mary's Celtic	2–3	0–1	May 1 • Celtic Park • 1,500; May 8 • Starlight Park • 2,500
Kearny Irish	8–5	New York Americans	3–1	5–1	April 17 • Clark Field • ??? May 1 • Starlight Park • ???

==== Semifinals ====
Higher Seed	Aggregate	Lower Seed	First leg	Second leg	Attendance
Philadelphia German-Americans	6–12	Scots-Americans	4–2	8–4	April 10 • Clark Field • 3,000; April 17 • 8th St. & Tabor Rd. • 3,500
St. Mary's Celtic	3–1	Kearny Irish	1–0	2–1	May 14 • Celtic Park • ??? May 15 • Scots Field • ???

==== ASL Championship Finals ====
Higher Seed	Aggregate	Lower Seed	First leg	Second leg	Attendance
Scots-Americans	6–4	St. Mary's Celtic	4–2	2–2	May 21 • Scots Field • ??? May 22 • Celtic Park • ???

== New England Division ==
American Soccer League New England Division
- Season: 1937–38
- Champions: Providence S.C.
- All statistics correct as of August 2, 2019.

Pos	Team	Pld (Note: Final standings available on May 30. Some teams played one or two games over the following two weekends. Those results are reflected in these standings.)	W	L	T	GF	GA	GD	Pts
1	Providence S.C.	17	11	2	4	48	19	+29	26
2	Thornton Victorias	17	10	3	4	40	26	+14	24
3	Boston Celts	16	8	4	4	31	27	+4	20
4	Lusitania Recreation	17	9	6	2	44	28	+16	20
5	Lusitano S.C.	17	7	5	5	31	34	−3	19
6	Swedish-Americans	16	7	7	2	29	30	−1	16
7	Springfield S.C.	16	3	8	5	26	40	−14	11
8	Scandinavians (Note: The final reported goals against for the Scandinavians is 10 goals too low. The error was made in the standings after their tenth game and was continued in the standings after that. This number corrects that error.)	16	3	11	2	27	39	−12	8
9	Moore's S.C.	17	2	12	3	36	57	−21	7
10	Pawtucket S.C.	5	1	3	1	9	12	−3	3 (Note: Pawtucket only played five games in the first half of the season. They dropped out of the league during the winter break.)
