= 1951–52 American Soccer League =

American Soccer League 1951–52 season
- Season: 1951–52
- Teams: 8
- Champions: Philadelphia Americans (6th title)
- Top goalscorer: Richard Roberts (19)

Statistics of American Soccer League II in season 1951–52.

== League standings ==
Pos	Team	Pld	W	L	D	GF	GA	Pts
1	Philadelphia Americans	13	6	3	4	30	18	16
2	Kearny Scots	13	7	5	1	39	31	15
3	Philadelphia Nationals	13	7	5	1	36	31	15
4	Brookhattan-Galicia	13	6	4	3	26	24	15
5	Irish-Americans/Newark Portuguese (Note: Irish-Americans sold franchise to Newark Portuguese in early December, 1951 and withdrew from the league after 7 games. Newark carried on with the Irish record.)	12	4	3	5	40	36	13
6	New York Americans	12	5	6	1	22	21	11
7	Hakoah	14	4	8	2	31	41	10
8	Brooklyn Hispano	12	2	7	3	15	28	7

== New England Division ==
Pos	Team	Pld	W	D	L	Pts
1	Ludlow Lusitano	9	7	1	1	15
2	New Bedford Peaches	10	5	3	2	13
3	Fall River S.C.	9	3	4	2	10
4	Ponta Delgada S.C.	10	2	4	4	8
5	Hartford Scandia	10	2	2	6	6
6	Lusitania Recreation	10	1	4	5	6
