= 1939–40 American Soccer League =

Statistics of American Soccer League II in season 1939–40.

== Metropolitan Division ==
American Soccer League Metropolitan Division
- Season: 1939–40
- Champions: Scots-Americans
- Top goalscorer: Charlie Ernst (24)
- All statistics correct as of August 2, 2019.

Pos	Team	Pld	W	D	L	Pts
1	Scots-Americans	17	12	3	2	27
2	Baltimore S.C.	17	10	3	4	23
3	Brookhattan	19	8	7	4	23
4	New York Americans	19	8	4	7	20
5	Irish-Americans	19	7	6	6	20
6	Philadelphia German-American	19	7	6	6	20
7	Brooklyn Hispano	19	7	6	6	20
8	St. Mary's Celtic	20	5	7	8	17
9	Passon Phillies	19	6	3	10	15
10	Paterson F.C.	17	2	5	10	9
11	Baltimore Americans	17	3	2	12	8
12	Allentown (Note: Allentown folded early in season)	0	?	?	?	0

== New England Division ==
American Soccer League New England Division
- Season: 1939–40
- Champions: Pawtucket S.C.
- All statistics correct as of August 2, 2019.

=== First half ===
Pos	Team	Pld	W	L	D	GF	GA	Pts
1	Swedish-Americans	12	8	2	2	–	–	18 (Note: On January 6, Swedish-Americans were 7-2-2 with 26 goals for and 18 goals against. The team was two points behind Lusitano and were scheduled to play a match against the Boston Celts on January 7. The result of that game is not known. But, at some point in January, the Swedish-Americans won a match and tied Lusitano for the top of the standings.)
2	Lusitano Sports Club	12	7	1	4	41	20	18
3	Lusitania Recreation	10	4	2	4	27	21	12
4	Bird & Sons	10	4	4	2	28	27	10
5	Boston Celts	10	4	5	1	15	19	9
6	Pawtucket S.C.	10	3	4	3	27	26	9
7	Scandinavians	11	0	11	0	13	46	0

=== Second half ===
Pos	Team	Pld	W	L	D	GF	GA	Pts	PCT
1	Pawtucket S.C.	11	9	1	1	44	14	19	.864
2	Lusitano Sports Club	9	5	3	1	19	22	11	.611
3	Swedish-Americans	8	4	3	1	20	10	9	.563
4	Boston Celts	10	4	3	3	24	24	11	.550
5	Lusitania Recreation	6	1	4	1	14	17	3	.250
6	Scandinavians	6	0	5	1	6	24	1	.083
7	Bird & Son	4	0	4	0	6	22	0	.000

=== Playoffs ===
==== First half playoff ====
The Swedish-Americans and Lusitano S.C. ended the first half tied for first place. A playoff was held to determine the first half champions.

March 17, 1940

Lusitano S.C.	1–8	Swedish-Americans
Leadbetter (own goal)		Valentine,,, Harris, Lanifero,

Lusitania Stadium, East Cambridge, Massachusetts
Referee: T. Byrnes

==== Final ====
June 16, 1940

Pawtucket S.C	3–0	Swedish-Americans
Florie, Quinn

Santa Clara Stadium, East Providence, Rhode Island

June 23, 1940

Swedish-Americans	1–0	Pawtucket S.C
McKechine

Norton Field, Worcester, Massachusetts

Pawtucket wins, 3–1, on aggregate.
