= 1941–42 American Soccer League =

Statistics of American Soccer League II in season 1941–42.

== Metropolitan Division ==
American Soccer League Metropolitan Division
- Season: 1941–42
- Champions: Philadelphia Americans
- Top goalscorer: John Nanoski (20)
- All statistics correct as of August 2, 2019.

Pos	Team	Pld	W	L	D	GF	GA	Pts	PCT
1	Philadelphia Germans/Americans (Note: During the season, after the Attack on Pearl Harbor, Philadelphia Germans changed their name to Philadelphia Americans.)	19	12	5	2	39	24	26	.684
2	Brookhattan	19	9	4	6	41	22	24	.632
3	Brooklyn Hispano/Brooklyn (Note: During the season, after the Attack on Pearl Harbor, Brooklyn Hispano changed their name to become Brooklyn.)	17	8	4	5	34	33	21	.618
4	New York Americans	19	8	4	7	34	27	23	.605
5	Baltimore S.C.	19	9	6	4	41	31	22	.579
6	Scots-Americans/Kearny Americans (Note: During the season, after the Attack on Pearl Harbor, Scots-Americans changed their name to Kearny Americans.)	19	8	8	3	56	43	19	.500
7	St. Mary's Celtic	19	7	9	3	53	53	17	.447
8	Irish-Americans	9	5	0	4	40	46	14	.778
9	Philadelphia Nationals	19	5	11	3	32	52	13	.342
10	Baltimore Americans	19	1	13	5	31	70	7	.184

== New England Division ==
American Soccer League New England Division
- Season: 1941–42
- Champions: St. Michael's (unofficial)
- All statistics correct as of August 2, 2019.

=== First half ===
Pos	Team	Pld	W	L	D	GF	GA	Pts
1	St. Michael's	6	3	2	1	0	0	7
2	Scandinavians	6	3	2	1	10	11	7
3	Swedish-Americans	6	3	3	0	0	0	6
4	Boston Celts	6	2	4	0	8	13	4

=== Second half ===
After a two-week break for the American League Cup finals, the second half of the league season began on November 30. But, after two weeks of games, the league practically ground to a halt due to the Attack on Pearl Harbor and the U.S.'s entry into World War II. In addition, chaos seemed to rein as the league attempted to continue the competition through difficult times. The league complied with the Scandinavians request to replay the first half playoff game with St. Michael's in early February. The replay was not played and the league went on hold waiting for that and other games. The Swedes and Scans never returned to the league. On May 3, one more league game was played as the Celts beat St. Michael's 3-0.

Pos	Team	Pld	W	L	D	GF	GA	Pts
1	Swedish-Americans	2	2	0	0	5	1	4
2	Boston Celts	3	1	2	0	6	6	2
3	St. Michael's	3	1	2	0	4	6	2
4	Scandinavians	2	1	1	0	1	3	2

Final official second half standings available on February 5. The Celts and St. Michael's played one more match on May 3 that is not included in these standings.

==== First Half Playoff ====
St. Michael's and Scandinavians ended the first half tied for first place. A playoff was held to determine the first half champions.

November 9, 1941

St. Michael's	3–1	Scandinavians
Humphries, Mickey Roche		Hammer

Celtic Park, South Boston, Massachusetts
