= 1938–39 American Soccer League =

Statistics of American Soccer League II in season 1938–39.

== Metropolitan Division ==
American Soccer League Metropolitan Division
- Season: 1938–39
- Champions: Scots-Americans
- Premiers: Brookhattan
- Top goalscorer: Bert Patenaude (24)
- All statistics correct as of August 2, 2019.

National Division
Team	Pld	W	L	T	GF	GA	Pts
Scots Americans	22	12	4	6	63	34	30
St. Mary's Celtic	22	11	7	4	62	46	26
Passon Phillies	22	8	7	7	53	53	23
New York Americans	22	9	9	4	49	50	22
Trenton Highlanders	22	5	13	4	43	74	14
Baltimore Germans	22	3	16	3	53	87	9

American Division
Team	Pld	W	L	T	GF	GA	Pts
Brookhattan F.C.	22	13	5	4	63	41	30
Philadelphia German-American	22	12	6	4	51	33	28
Irish Americans	22	13	7	2	55	47	28
Brooklyn Hispano F.C.	22	11	6	5	56	46	27
Baltimore S.C.	22	9	11	2	50	50	20
Bethlehem Hungarian	22	3	18	1	35	78	7

=== Playoffs ===
==== First round ====
- Philadelphia German-American defeated Brooklyn St. Mary's 3–0
- Philadelphia Passon defeated Kearny Irish 3–0

==== Semifinals ====
- Kearny Scots defeated Brookhattan 4–2, 1–1
- Philadelphia German-American defeated Philadelphia Passon 3–2

==== Championship finals ====
- Kearny Scots defeated Philadelphia German-American, 3–2, 4–2

== New England Division ==
American Soccer League -New England Division-
- Season: 1938–39
- Champions: Lusitania Recreation
- All statistics correct as of August 2, 2019.

Pos	Team	Pld	W	L	T	GF	GA	Pts
1	Lusitania Recreation	11	8	1	2	34	15	18 (Note: Final formal standings available on January 6. No league matches were played from late November through February. All scheduled league games during this time were canceled or postponed due to weather. Following that, Lusitania played two more games, one against Boston on March 5th and one against Swedish-Americans on March 12th to clinch the league championship. Goal totals for the Boston-Lucy Recs match are included but goal totals aren't known for the Lucy Recs-Swedish Americans match.)
2	Ludlow Lusitano	10	4	1	5	29	19	13
3	Swedish-Americans	9	3	4	2	13	12	8
4	Boston Celts	12	0	9	3	14	44	3
