= 1944–45 American Soccer League =

American Soccer League 1944–45 season
- Season: 1944–45
- Teams: 10
- Champions: Brookhattan
- Top goalscorer: John Nanoski (22)

Statistics of American Soccer League II in season 1944–45.

== League standings ==
Pos	Team	Pld	W	D	L	GF	GA	Pts	PCT
1	Brookhattan	20	11	6	3	54	46	28	.700
2	Philadelphia Americans	19	11	4	4	64	27	26	.684
3	Brooklyn Wanderers	18	10	3	5	39	33	23	.639
4	Baltimore Americans	17	6	5	6	35	39	17	.500
5	Philadelphia Nationals	19	6	6	7	40	40	18	.474
6	Kearny Scots	19	5	8	6	33	45	18	.474
7	Kearny Celtic	18	6	5	7	41	38	17	.472
8	Brooklyn Hispano	20	9	0	11	49	46	18	.450
9	New York Americans	18	6	4	8	37	45	18 (Note: +2 points?)	.500
10	Baltimore S.C.	18	1	3	14	23	56	5	.139
