= 1945–46 American Soccer League =

American Soccer League 1945–46 season
- Season: 1945–46
- Teams: 10
- Champions: Baltimore Americans
- Top goalscorer: Fabri Salcedo (24)

Statistics of American Soccer League II in season 1945–46.

== League standings ==
Pos	Team	Pld	W	D	L	GF	GA	Pts
1	Baltimore Americans	20	13	3	4	61	40	29
2	Brooklyn Hispano	20	12	3	5	54	34	27
3	Kearny Celtic	20	10	5	5	50	46	25
4	Brooklyn Wanderers	20	8	6	6	49	46	22
5	New York Americans	20	9	3	8	53	44	21
6	Kearny Scots	20	9	3	8	42	47	21
7	Brookhattan	20	7	3	10	55	51	17
8	Philadelphia Americans	19	6	4	9	41	38	16
9	Philadelphia Nationals	20	5	5	10	36	44	15
10	Baltimore S.C.	19	2	1	16	32	82	5
