= 1935–36 American Soccer League =

Statistics of American Soccer League II in season 1935–36.

== Metropolitan Division ==
American Soccer League Metropolitan Division
- Season: 1935–36
- Champions: New York Americans
- Top goalscorer: Alex Rae (28)
- All statistics correct as of August 1, 2019.

Pos	Team	Pld	W	T	L	GF	GA	GD	Pts
1	New York Americans	24	18	3	3	40	23	+17	39
2	Canton S.C.	24	12	4	8	39	37	+2	28
3	Scots-Americans	24	11	5	8	34	24	+10	27
4	Philadelphia German-American	20	10	5	5	45	46	−1	25
5	Newark Germans	22	8	5	9	43	40	+3	21
6	St. Mary's Celtic	19	6	8	5	43	44	−1	20
7	Brookhattan	22	8	3	11	27	34	−7	19
8	Irish-Americans	23	6	4	13	34	46	−12	16
9	Brooklyn Hispano	22	5	3	14	30	42	−12	13

== New England Division ==
American Soccer League -New England Division-
- Season: 1934–35
- All statistics correct as of August 1, 2019. League dormant for season

In mid-September 1935, Sam Fletcher, President of the New England Division, announced that the league would be dormant for the season after a number of teams withdrew.
