= 1947–48 American Soccer League =

American Soccer League 1947–48 season
- Season: 1947–48
- Teams: 10
- Champions: Philadelphia Americans (5th title)
- Top goalscorer: Nicholas Kropfelder (19)

Statistics of American Soccer League II in season 1947–48.

== League standings ==
Pos	Team	Pld	W	D	L	GF	GA	Pts
1	Philadelphia Americans	19	14	1	4	60	34	29
2	Kearny Scots	17	9	5	3	40	27	23
3	Brooklyn Wanderers	17	10	3	4	39	32	23
4	Baltimore Americans	17	9	2	6	48	32	20
5	Philadelphia Nationals	18	8	3	7	40	37	19
6	New York Americans	17	7	3	7	35	34	17
7	Brookhattan	18	6	3	9	38	43	15
8	Baltimore S.C.	18	6	2	10	35	47	14
9	Kearny Celtic	18	3	4	11	23	45	10
10	Brooklyn Hispano	17	1	4	12	28	55	6
