= 1950–51 American Soccer League =

American Soccer League 1950–51 season
- Season: 1950–51
- Teams: 9
- Champions: Philadelphia Nationals (3rd title)
- Top goalscorer: Nicholas Kropfelder (17)

Statistics of American Soccer League II in season 1950–51.

== League standings ==
Pos	Team	Pld	W	D	L	Pts
1	Philadelphia Nationals	13	11	0	2	22
2	Kearny Scots	14	7	3	4	17
3	Kearny Celtic	13	6	3	4	15
4	Brookhattan	13	6	0	7	12
5	New York Americans	15	5	2	8	12
6	Philadelphia Americans	12	5	1	6	11
7	Trenton Americans	12	5	0	7	10
8	Brooklyn Hakoah	13	4	2	7	10
9	Brooklyn Hispano	13	4	1	8	9
