= 1943–44 American Soccer League =

Statistics of American Soccer League II in season 1943–44.

== Metropolitan Division ==
American Soccer League Metropolitan Division
- Season: 1943–44
- Champions: Philadelphia Americans
- Top goalscorer: Tommy Marshall (21)
- All statistics correct as of August 5, 2019.

Pos	Team	Pld	W	L	D	GF	GA	GD	PCT
1	Philadelphia Americans	19	15	2	2	59	24	+35	.842 (Note: For this season, league standings determined by percentage basis rather than points due to unbalanced schedule.)
2	Brooklyn Wanderers	17	12	4	1	42	27	+15	.735
3	Baltimore Americans	13	7	4	2	41	30	+11	.615
4	Philadelphia Nationals	19	9	7	3	52	44	+8	.553
5	Brooklyn Hispano	17	8	8	1	33	32	+1	.500
6	Kearny Celtic	17	7	8	2	43	40	+3	.471
7	Brookhattan	17	6	8	3	43	50	−7	.441
8	Kearny Americans	17	5	8	4	33	37	−4	.412
9	New York Americans	17	1	11	5	26	43	−17	.206
10	Baltimore S.C.	13	1	11	1	18	63	−45	.115

== New England Division ==
American Soccer League New England Division
- Season: 1943–44
- Top goalscorer: Tommy Marshall (21)
- All statistics correct as of August 5, 2019. League dormant for season.

The league was dormant in its final season.
