= 1942–43 American Soccer League =

Statistics of American Soccer League II in season 1942–43.

== Metropolitan Division ==
American Soccer League Metropolitan Division
- Season: 1942–43
- Champions: Brooklyn Hispano
- Top goalscorer: Chappie Sheppell (12)
- All statistics correct as of August 5, 2019.

Pos	Team	Pld	W	D	L	GF	GA	Pts	PCT
1	Brooklyn Hispano	18	11	3	4	38	23	25	.694
2	Brookhattan	18	10	2	6	49	34	22	.611
3	Philadelphia Americans	18	10	1	7	47	28	21	.583
4	Brooklyn Wanderers	14	7	1	6	21	27	15	.536
5	Baltimore Americans	16	7	2	7	32	35	16	.500
6	New York Americans	18	6	4	8	25	28	16	.444
7	Kearny Celtic	16	6	2	8	37	44	14	.438
8	Kearny Americans	15	4	2	9	28	42	10	.333
9	Philadelphia Nationals	17	5	1	11	27	43	11	.324

== New England Division ==
American Soccer League New England Division
- Season: 1942–43
- All statistics correct as of August 5, 2019. League dormant this season

The league went dormant for this and the following season.
