= 1948–49 American Soccer League =

American Soccer League 1948–49 season
- Season: 1948–49
- Teams: 9
- Champions: Philadelphia Nationals
- Premiers: Philadelphia Nationals, New York Americans, & Brooklyn Hispano
- Top goalscorer: Pito Villanon (17)

Statistics of American Soccer League II in season 1948–49.

== League standings ==
Pos	Team	Pld	W	D	L	GF	GA	Pts
1	Philadelphia Nationals	16	10	2	4	57	35	22
1	New York Americans	16	10	2	4	33	22	22
1	Brooklyn Hispano	16	10	2	4	31	24	22
4	Brookhattan	15	7	3	5	39	35	17
5	Kearny Scots	14	6	3	5	36	32	15
6	Philadelphia Americans	15	4	4	7	29	35	12
7	Kearny Celtic	16	4	3	9	30	37	11
8	Trenton Americans	15	4	1	10	29	41	9
9	Brooklyn Wanderers/Hakoah A.C. (Note: After two games the Brooklyn Wanderers franchise was sold to the owners of Hakoah A.C. club. Hakoah left the National League to play in the ASL and took on the Wanderers' win and tie.)	13	3	0	10	20	43	6
–	Baltimore Americans (Note: After three games, the league purchased the Baltimore American's franchise.)	~~3~~	~~1~~	~~1~~	~~1~~	~~5~~	~~3~~	0 (Note: Games played against Baltimore Americans were removed from the standings and the team was removed from the official league standings.)

== Championship playoff series ==
Since three teams finished the season with the same point totals, a two-match, championship playoff was held. Brooklyn Hispano hosted New York Americans in the first match. The winner of that play-in contest earned the right to face Philadelphia Nationals two weeks later. In the event that either of these matches ended in a draw the following procedures were to be used. Two 15-minute overtime periods to be played in their entirety. If the match was still tied after 120 minutes, the teams would then play two 7.5-minute periods. If still tied after 135 minutes, successive 7.5 minute periods would be played until one team either scored a golden goal or earned a corner kick.

=== Bracket ===
Semifinal			Final
			1	Philadelphia Nationals	2
2	New York Americans	4	2	New York Americans	2
3	Brooklyn Hispano	0

=== Match one – Play-in game ===
April 24, 1949
2:30 PM

Brooklyn Hispano	0–4	New York Americans
	Report	John O'Connell 30' (Ossowski); John O'Connell 38' (Keagins); John O'Connell 55' (Hynes); Dick Roberts 75'

Hawthorne Field, Brooklyn, New York
Referee: Jim Stevenson

=== Match two – Championship final ===
The championship final played out as 90 minutes of regulation and 45 minutes of extra time, before moving to the first period of sudden death (via goal or corner kick). Jim Mills earned a corner kick for Philadelphia to end the match.

May 8, 1949

New York Americans	2–2 AET	Philadelphia Nationals
Jack Hynes 14'; Dick Roberts	Report	Ray McFaul; Jack Sullivan; Corner kick: Jim Mills

Triborough Stadium, New York, New York
Attendance: 15,000
Referee: F. Coggin
