= 1934–35 American Soccer League =

Statistics of American Soccer League II in season 1934–35.

== Metropolitan Division ==
American Soccer League Metropolitan Division
- Season: 1934–35
- Champions: Philadelphia German-American
- Top goalscorer: Millard Lang (14)
- All statistics correct as of August 1, 2019.

Pos	Team	Pld	W	T	L	GF	GA	Pts
1	Philadelphia German-American	22	18	1	3	47	24	37
2	New York Americans	24	12	4	8	38	24	28
3	Brookhattan	24	10	5	9	42	38	25
4	Brooklyn Hispano	24	8	8	8	40	23	24
5	Newark Germans	23	9	4	10	32	48	22
6	Canton S.C.	24	9	2	13	44	49	20
7	Brooklyn Celtic	24	8	3	13	32	41	19
8	Scots-Americans	24	7	5	12	28	37	19
9	Irish-Americans	23	8	2	13	26	40	18

Source: American Soccer League II (RSSSF)

== New England Division ==
American Soccer League New England Division
- Season: 1934–35
- Champions: Portuguese Sport Club
- All statistics correct as of August 1, 2019.

=== First half ===
Pos	Team	Pld	W	T	L	GF	GA	Pts
1	Pawtucket Rangers	12	10	1	1	36	12	21
2	Portuguese Sport Club	12	5	1	6	24	25	11
3	Pawtucket Celtics	10	4	1	5	22	34	9
4	Thornton Victorias	11	4	0	7	16	22	8
5	Boston Soccer Club	9	2	1	6	20	25	5

Source: American Soccer League II – New England Division (RSSSF)

=== Second half ===
Pos	Team	Pld	W	T	L	GF	GA	Pts
1	Portuguese Sport Club	4	4	0	0	0	0	8
2	Boston Soccer Club	3	2	0	1	0	0	4
3	Pawtucket Rangers	2	1	0	1	0	0	2
4	Pawtucket Celtics	1	0	0	1	0	0	0
5	Thornton Victorias	3	0	0	3	0	0	0

Source: American Soccer League II – New England Division (RSSSF)

As in the previous season, the second half of the New England Division's season was truncated due to the league's teams taking part in the National Challenge Cup during the first three months of the year. The second half finally started on the last day of March but only lasted a month before fading out at the end of April. The league season was technically still open during May but no games were played in large part due to Pawtucket's drive to become the National Challenge Cup champions.

=== Playoff ===
At the end of May, and with little fanfare, a playoff between the first and second half winners was held to determine the championship of the New England Division.

May 26, 1935

Portuguese Sport Club	1–0	Pawtucket Rangers
O'Keefe

Providence, Rhode Island
Referee: Parker
