= 1946–47 American Soccer League =

American Soccer League 1946–47 season
- Season: 1946–47
- Teams: 10
- Champions: Philadelphia Americans (4th title)
- Top goalscorer: Bill Fisher (17)

Statistics of American Soccer League II in season 1946–47.

== League standings ==
| Pos | Team | Pld | W | D | L | GF | GA | Pts |
|---|---|---|---|---|---|---|---|---|
| 1 | Philadelphia Americans | 20 | 14 | 3 | 3 | 56 | 26 | 31 |
| 2 | Brooklyn Wanderers | 18 | 10 | 5 | 3 | 56 | 41 | 25 |
| 3 | Brooklyn Hispano | 20 | 10 | 2 | 8 | 48 | 38 | 22 |
| 4 | Baltimore Americans | 19 | 9 | 4 | 6 | 44 | 42 | 22 |
| 5 | Kearny Scots | 20 | 7 | 5 | 8 | 32 | 42 | 19 |
| 6 | New York Americans | 19 | 8 | 2 | 9 | 38 | 42 | 18 |
| 7 | Kearny Celtic | 19 | 6 | 5 | 8 | 27 | 30 | 17 |
| 8 | Philadelphia Nationals | 18 | 6 | 3 | 9 | 45 | 44 | 15 |
| 9 | Brookhattan | 20 | 5 | 3 | 12 | 31 | 49 | 13 |
| 10 | Baltimore S.C. | 15 | 3 | 2 | 10 | 19 | 39 | 8 |
