= 1952–53 American Soccer League =

Statistics of American Soccer League II in season 1952–53

American Soccer League 1952–53 season
- Season: 1952–53
- Teams: 8
- Champions: Philadelphia Nationals (4th title)
- Top goalscorer: Pito Villanon

Statistics of American Soccer League II in season 1952–53.

== League standings ==
Pos	Team	Pld	W	L	D	GF	GA	Pts
1	Philadelphia Nationals	14	10	2	2	34	17	22
2	Newark Portuguese	14	7	4	3	33	27	17
3	Philadelphia Americans	14	6	4	4	21	18	16
4	Brooklyn Hispano	14	6	5	3	30	32	15
5	Brookhattan-Galicia	14	6	7	1	19	22	13
6	New York Americans	12	3	6	3	19	19	9
7	Scots-Americans	12	2	6	4	20	32	8
8	Hakoah	12	3	9	0	14	23	6

== New England Division ==
Pos	Team	Pld	W	D	L	Pts
1	Ponta Delgada S.C.	10	8	0	2	16
2	Ludlow Lusitano	10	6	3	1	15
3	Attleboro Port-American	10	6	1	3	13
4	Fall River S.C.	14	2	4	8	8
5	Lusitania Recreation	14	2	4	8	8
6	St. Michaela	14	2	4	8	8
