= 1933–34 American Soccer League =

1933–34 American Soccer League was the first season of the second American Soccer League.

== Overview ==
The league included two teams, New York Americans and New York Brookhattan that had also played in the original ASL. The USFA awarded the new ASL exclusive rights to organize professional soccer on the Atlantic Coast. The new ASL operated at a considerably lower level of professionalism than its predecessor. With the Great Depression still raging, it was not possible to offer salaries anywhere near the level enjoyed by the previous league.

The inaugural season of 1933–34 saw a fairly impressive level of competition, as well as a few of the stars of the old league including Archie Stark and George Moorhouse. New York Americans in particular had a wealth of familiar names including Stan Chesney and Erno Schwarz in addition to Moorhouse. Kearny Irish were the first league champions in the Metropolitan Division, winning the league title by a comfortable 4 points ahead of New York Americans. Kearny Scots finished a distant third. After 12 games Brooklyn F.C. merged with Hispano F.C. The aggregation was renamed Brooklyn Hispano Football Club which began play on January 21, 1934 and assumed the record of Hispano F.C. in the standings.

== Metropolitan Division ==
American Soccer League Metropolitan Division
- Season: 1933–34
- Champions: Irish-Americans
- Top goalscorer: Archie Stark (20); Razzo Carroll (20)
- All statistics correct as of August 1, 2019.

Pos	Team	Pld	W	T	L	GF	GA	Pts
1	Irish Americans	25	15	6	4	60	35	36
2	New York Americans	23	14	4	5	59	34	32
3	Scots-Americans	25	11	3	11	58	53	25
4	Brookhattan	24	8	3	13	45	51	19
5	Brooklyn Celtic	22	7	2	13	37	47	16
6	Newark Germans	19	7	1	11	32	49	15
7	Hispano F.C./Brooklyn Hispano	17	6	2	9	26	45	14
8	Philadelphia German-American	13	5	2	6	27	28	12

== New England Division ==
American Soccer League New England Division
- Season: 1933–34
- Champions: Fairlawn Rovers
- All statistics correct as of August 1, 2019.

=== First half ===
Pos	Team	Pld	W	T	L	GF	GA	Pts
1	Fairlawn Rovers	16	12	1	3	52	28	25
2	Boston Celtics	15	10	2	3	50	28	22
3	Thornton Victorias	15	6	5	4	32	27	21
4	Pawtucket Rangers	14	8	3	3	38	19	19
5	Fall River Rovers	15	5	4	6	25	27	14
6	New Bedford Defenders	16	6	2	8	39	51	14
7	Fall River United	14	4	2	8	32	45	10
8	Quincy Canadians	15	2	3	10	24	58	7
9	New Bedford Tessiers	14	2	2	10	24	42	6

=== Second half ===
Pos	Team	Pld	W	T	L	GF	GA	Pts
1	Fairlawn Rovers (Note: Sam Fletcher, President of the New England Division, announced the spring schedule would be cancelled due to conflict with baseball season. Fairlawn Rovers declared champions of the league.)	3	3	0	0	7	3	9
2	Thornton Victorias	3	1	1	1	6	6	3
3	Boston Celtics	1	0	1	0	3	3	1
4	Quincy Canadians	1	0	1	0	2	2	1
5	Pawtucket Rangers	1	0	1	0	2	2	1
6	Fall River United	2	0	1	1	5	6	1
7	Fall River Rovers	3	0	1	2	6	9	1

== Top goalscorers ==
Rank	Scorer	Club	GP	G
1st-t	Archie Stark	Kearny Irish	?	22
1st-t	Razzo Carroll	Kearny Scots	?	22
