= 1953–54 American Soccer League =

American Soccer League 1953–54 season
- Season: 1953–54
- Teams: 9
- Champions: New York Americans (2nd title)
- Top goalscorer: Jack Calder (19)

Statistics of American Soccer League II in season 1953–54.

== League standings ==
| Pos | Team | Pld | W | L | D | GF | GA | Pts |
|---|---|---|---|---|---|---|---|---|
| 1 | New York Americans | 14 | 11 | 2 | 1 | 35 | 16 | 23 |
| 2 | Brookhattan-Galicia | 15 | 10 | 3 | 2 | 39 | 25 | 22 |
| 3 | Newark Portuguese | 16 | 9 | 3 | 4 | 39 | 26 | 22 |
| 4 | Brooklyn Hispano | 13 | 5 | 3 | 5 | 22 | 21 | 15 |
| 5 | Hakoah | 14 | 6 | 6 | 2 | 26 | 28 | 14 |
| 6 | Trenton Americans | 15 | 4 | 8 | 3 | 16 | 27 | 11 |
| 7 | Baltimore Rockets | 15 | 3 | 7 | 5 | 22 | 36 | 11 |
| 8 | Philadelphia Americans/Uhrik Truckers (Note: The Philadelphia Americans franchise was purchased by Uhrik Truckers in December, 1953 and formally changed names in February, 1954.) | 14 | 2 | 7 | 5 | 25 | 33 | 9 |
| 9 | Philadelphia Nationals (Note: "The Philadelphia Nationals, after playing four matches, of which they won two, lost one and tied one, have disbanded. All remaining scheduled games are forfeited and credited to opposing teams by the score of 1-0 each.") | 16 | 2 | 13 | 1 | 10 | 22 | 5 |
