= George Nemchik =

American soccer player

Personal information
- Full name: George Nemchik
- Date of birth: March 14, 1915
- Place of birth: Superior, Pennsylvania, United States
- Date of death: July 11, 1988 (aged 73)
- Place of death: Trenton, New Jersey, United States
- Position: Forward

Youth career
- Temple University

Senior career*
Years	Team	Apps	(Gls)
1934–1941	Philadelphia German-Americans		
1941–1942	Philadelphia Nationals		
1942–1943	Kearny Celtic		
1943–1944	New York Americans		
1944–1945	Brookhattan	18	(18)
1946–19??	Chicago Viking		

International career
1937	United States	3	(1)
- * Club domestic league appearances and goals

George Nemchik (March 14, 1915 – July 11, 1988) was a U.S. soccer player. He spent twelve season in the American Soccer League and later won the National Challenge Cup with the amateur Chicago Viking. Nemchik earned three caps, scoring one goal, with the U.S. national team in 1937. He was also a member of the 1936 U.S. Olympic Soccer team.

Raised in Trenton, New Jersey, Nemchik competed in multiple sports at Trenton Central High School, from which he graduated in 1932.

== Club career ==
Nemchik attended Temple University where he played collegiate soccer. In 1939, he was named a first team All American. While at Temple, he was also an All American baseball player. However, Temple registers his last name as Nemchick.

In 1934, while at Temple, Nemchik signed with the Philadelphia German-Americans of the American Soccer League (ASL). The German-Americans won the ASL title in 1935 and the National Challenge Cup in 1936. In 1941, he moved to the Philadelphia Nationals for one season. In 1942, Nemchik moved, this time to Kearny Celtic After only two seasons with the New Jersey club, he moved, this time to the New York Americans in 1944. After only a single season, Nemchik jumped across town to Brookhattan for the 1944–1945 season. In this, his last, season in the ASL, Nemchik won another ASL championship and the 1945 National Challenge Cup. He then left the east coast and moved to Chicago where he joined Chicago Viking of the North American Soccer Football League. That year, the Vikings won the 1946 National Challenge Cup over Fall River Ponta Delgado.

== National and Olympic team ==
Nemchik was selected for the U.S. soccer team which lost to Italy in the first round of the 1936 Summer Olympics.

Nemchik earned three caps with the U.S. national team in 1937. All three games were losses to Mexico in September. However, Nemchik scored a goal in the second game, a 2–7 loss in Mexico City.

He was born in Superior, Pennsylvania and died in Trenton, New Jersey.
