= 1949–50 American Soccer League =

American Soccer League 1949–50 season
- Season: 1949–50
- Teams: 9
- Champions: Philadelphia Nationals (2nd title)
- Top goalscorer: Joe Gaetjens (18)

Statistics of American Soccer League II in season 1949–50.

== League standings ==
Pos	Team	Pld	W	D	L	GF	GA	Pts
1	Philadelphia Nationals	16	12	1	3	50	31	25
2	Irish Americans (Note: The club returned to their original name.)	16	8	3	5	37	32	19
3	New York Americans	16	6	6	4	31	27	18
4	Hakoah F.C.	16	7	2	7	31	35	16
5	Kearny Scots	16	4	7	5	36	35	15
6	Philadelphia Americans	14	4	5	5	27	31	13
7	Trenton Americans	15	4	3	8	36	44	11
8	Brooklyn Hispano	14	3	5	6	26	32	11
9	Brookhattan	15	3	4	8	31	38	10
