= Joe Martinelli =

American soccer player

Personal information
- Full name: Joseph Martinelli
- Date of birth: August 22, 1916
- Place of birth: United States
- Date of death: July 20, 1991 (aged 74)
- Position: Forward

International career
Years	Team	Apps	(Gls)
- United States

Joseph Martinelli (August 22, 1916 – July 20, 1991) was an American soccer forward. Martinelli spent thirteen seasons in the American Soccer League and earned three caps with the U.S. national team in 1937.

== American Soccer League ==
In 1934, Martinelli began his professional career when he signed with the Pawtucket Rangers of the American Soccer League (ASL). In 1934 and 1935, the Rangers finished runner-up in the U.S. National Challenge Cup. After playing in the 1935 Challenge Cup final, Martinelli moved to the New York Americans where he won the 1935–1936 league title. In 1937, Martinelli finally won the Challenge Cup title when the Americans defeated the St. Louis Shamrocks. Martinelli then went on to play with several other ASL teams, including Brooklyn St. Mary's Celtic, the Philadelphia German-Americans, Brooklyn Wanderers and Kearny Scots. He retired in 1947.

== National team ==
While Martinelli was selected for the U.S. squad at the 1934 FIFA World Cup, he did not enter the lone U.S. game, a 7–1 loss to Italy in the first round. However, Martinelli went on to earn three caps with the U.S. national team in 1937. All three were losses to Mexico in September.
