= 1957–58 American Soccer League =

American Soccer League 1957–58 season
- Season: 1957–58
- Teams: 11
- Champions: New York Hakoah (2nd title)
- Top goalscorer: Lloyd Monsen (22)

Statistics of American Soccer League II in season 1957–58.

== League standings ==
Pos	Team	Pld	W	D	L	GF	GA	Pts
1	New York Hakoah	18	16	0	2	66	22	32
2	Ukrainian Nationals	17	12	3	2	57	16	27
3	Baltimore Pompei	18	11	3	4	49	35	25
4	Brookhattan-Galicia	16	9	0	7	43	36	18
5	Fall River S.C.	18	6	3	9	23	40	15
6	Elizabeth Falcons	14	6	2	6	25	36	14
7	Uhrik Truckers	17	4	4	9	33	43	12
8	Newark Portuguese	16	3	6	7	29	42	12
9	Ludlow Lusitano	15	2	3	10	19	44	7
10	Brooklyn Italians	15	0	2	13	15	45	2
11	Philadelphia Ukrainians	~~1~~	~~1~~	~~0~~	~~0~~	–	–	0

Source: rsssf.com
