= Charles Altemose =

American soccer player (1913–1995)

Charlie Altmose
Personal information
- Full name: Charles William Altemose Jr.
- Date of birth: June 3, 1913
- Date of death: January 26, 1995 (aged 81)
- Place of death: Bethlehem, Pennsylvania, U.S.

Senior career*
Years	Team	Apps	(Gls)
1935–	Philadelphia German-Americans		
- Brooklyn Hispano
–1947	Philadelphia Nationals		

International career
1936	United States	1	(0)
- * Club domestic league appearances and goals

Charlie "Chili" Altemose (June 3, 1913 – January 26, 1995, in Bethlehem, Pennsylvania) was a U.S. soccer player who was a member of the U.S. soccer team at the 1936 Summer Olympics. He also played twelve seasons in the American Soccer League.

Altemose grew up in Bethlehem, Pennsylvania, where his father died in 1924. In 1935, he joined the Philadelphia German-Americans of the American Soccer League. In 1936, Altemose and his teammates won the 1936 National Challenge Cup. He later played for Brooklyn Hispano and finished his career with the Philadelphia Nationals in 1947. In 1936, he was selected for the U.S. team at the 1936 Summer Olympics. Altemose and his teammates played one game, a 1–0 loss to Italy.
