= Fred Lutkefedder =

American soccer player

Personal information
- Full name: Fred Lutkefedder
- Date of birth: April 15, 1910
- Date of death: April 28, 1986 (aged 76)
- Place of death: Philadelphia, Pennsylvania, United States

Senior career*
| Years | Team | Apps | (Gls) |
| 1933–1937 | Philadelphia German-Americans | | |
| 1937– | New York Americans | | |
- Philadelphia Passon
| –1944 | Philadelphia German-Americans | | |

International career
| 1936 | United States | 1 | (0) |
- * Club domestic league appearances and goals

Fred Lutkefedder (April 15, 1910 – April 28, 1986) was an American soccer player who was a member of the U.S. soccer team at the 1936 Summer Olympics.

In 1933, Lutkefedder signed with the Philadelphia German-Americans of the American Soccer League. The German-Americans won the 1936 National Challenge Cup in two games with Lutkefedder coming on as a substitute in the second game. In 1936, he was selected to play for the U.S. soccer team at the 1936 Summer Olympics. In 1937, he moved to the New York Americans. At some point, he moved to the Philadelphia Passon, returning to the German-Americans the 1943–1944 season. That year the German-Americans won the title. Lutkefedder retired at the end of the season.
