= 1939 National Challenge Cup =

Football cup championship in the United States

- Dewar Challenge Cup

Tournament details
- Country: United States
- Dates: December 11, 1938 – May 7, 1939

Final positions
- Champions: Brooklyn St. Mary's Celtic (1st title)
- Runners-up: Manhattan Beer (IL)
- Semifinalists: Morgan Sports Club; German American SC

The 1939 National Challenge Cup was the annual open cup held by the United States Football Association now known as the Lamar Hunt U.S. Open Cup. Brooklyn St. Mary's Celtic (New York) defeated Manhattan Beer (Illinois) 1-0 and 4-1 in a two-game final.

== Eastern Division ==
Round of 16
January 8 - Philadelphia
German American	2
Baltimore Germans	1
January 8 - Baltimore
Baltimore	4
Hatikvoh	0
January 8 - Brooklyn
Brooklyn Hispano	1
Holy Cross	2
January 8, 22
St. Michael's	3–0
Lusitania Recreation	4–1
January 8 - Bronx
Brookhattan	4
Bethlehem Hungarians	1
February 5, 11
Philadelphia Passon	3–2
Scots Americans	3–3
January 29 - Bronx
New York Americans	1
Brooklyn St. Mary's Celtic	3
January 8 - Kearny
Irish American	0
Trenton Highlanders	2

Quarter-finals
February 11 - Philadelphia
German American	1
Baltimore	0
February 12, 19
Holy Cross	1–1
Lusitania Recreation	1–2
March 19 - Bronx
Brookhattan	1
Scots Americans	0
February 12 - Brooklyn
Brooklyn St. Mary's Celtic	6
Trenton Highlanders	4

Semi-finals
March 26 - Philadelphia
German American	3
Lusitania Recreation	2
April 2 - Bronx
Brookhattan	1
Brooklyn St. Mary's Celtic	3

Final
April 15, 16
German American	0–2
Brooklyn St. Mary's Celtic	2–1

== Western Division ==
Round of 16
November 13 - Detroit
Bolton All-Stars	0
Chrysler S.C.	2
December 11 - Chicago
Manhattan Beer	4
Swedish American	0
December 11 - Buffalo
Beck's German-American	0
Kodak Park F.C.	1
Dec 11,18/Jan 2 - Cleveland
Shamrock S.C.	3^{a}
Bartunek Slavia	7
December 11 - Homestead
Curry S.C.	0
Castle Shannon-Deutsch Sport Club	3
December 11 - Bridgeville
Heidelberg S.C.	1
Morgan S.C.	2
December 11 - Chicago
Sparta Garden City	1
Olympia A.F.C.	0
February 12 - St. Louis
Lindell Trust S.C.	3
Burke S.C.	1

Quarter-finals
January 8 - Detroit
Chrysler	2
Manhattan Beer	4
January 8, 15
Kodak Park	1-0
Bartunek Slavia	1-3
January 8, 15 - Bridgeville
German Sport	1-0
Morgan	1-5
January 8 - Chicago
Sparta	7
Lindell Trust	1

Semi-finals
March 12 - Chicago
Manhattan Beer	3
Bartunek Slavia	2
March 12 - Pittsburgh
Morgan	4
Sparta	2

Final
April 2, 9
Manhattan Beer	2-3
Morgan	3-1

a) aggregate after 3 games

== Final ==
=== First game ===
April 30, 1939

Manhattan Beer (IL)	0–1	St. Mary's Celtic (NY)
		Nanoski 76'

Sparta Stadium, Chicago, Illinois
Attendance: 5,000
Referee: James Carleton

=== Second game ===
May 7, 1939

St. Mary's Celtic (NY)	4–1	Manhattan Beer (IL)
W. McEwan 1'; Nanoski 44', 52'; Kuntner 63' (pen.)		Gonsalves (pen.)

Starlight Park, The Bronx, New York
Attendance: 8,000
Referee: James Carleton
