= 1961–62 American Soccer League =

American Soccer League 1961–62 season
- Season: 1961–62
- Teams: 8
- Champions: Ukrainian Nationals (2nd title)
- Top goalscorer: Peter Millar (18)

In the 1961–62 American Soccer League II, Ukrainian Nationals won the championship. After the season, Galicia-Honduras withdrew.

== League standings ==
Pos	Team	Pld	W	D	L	GF	GA	Pts
1	Ukrainian Nationals	20	16	1	3	54	24	33
2	Inter-Brooklyn Italians	23	12	4	7	73	50	28
3	Newark Portuguese	19	11	3	5	46	31	25
4	Fall River SC	18	8	2	8	29	30	18
5	New York Hakoah	19	6	5	8	31	35	17
6	Falcons SC	21	5	2	14	35	51	12
7	Galicia-Honduras	20	2	4	14	28	49	8
8	Uhrik Truckers	17	1	1	15	26	78	3

Errors in table: 61 total wins does not match 74 total losses!
