= Henry Carroll (soccer) =

American soccer player

Razzo Carroll
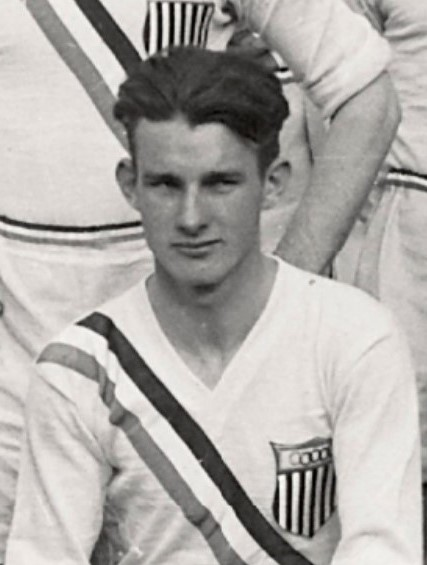
- Henry Carroll in 1928

Personal information
- Full name: Henry C. Carroll
- Date of birth: July 12, 1905
- Place of birth: New Jersey
- Date of death: January 14, 1999 (aged 93)
- Position: Forward

Senior career*
Years	Team	Apps	(Gls)
- Bayonne Rovers S.C.
1929–1931	Brooklyn Wanderers	14	(8)
- Kearny Scots
- Brookhattan
- Philadelphia Americans
- Brooklyn Hispano

International career
1928	United States	2	(1)
- * Club domestic league appearances and goals

Henry "Razzo" Carroll (July 12, 1905 – January 14, 1999) was an American soccer player who played as a forward in both the first and second American Soccer Leagues. He led the league in scoring in 1934. He also earned two caps, scoring one goal, with the U.S. national team in 1928.

Carroll began his club career with the Bayonne Rovers S.C. in the late 1920s. He was selected for the U.S. team at the 1928 Summer Olympics. On May 20, 1928, the U.S. lost by a score of 11–2 to Argentina in the first round. Carroll scored the second of the two U.S. goals. As the tournament was single elimination, the U.S. now had free time so they traveled to Warsaw where they tied Poland 3–3, Carroll playing in that game.

In 1929, Carroll signed with the Brooklyn Wanderers in the American Soccer League. However, he did not break into the first team until the 1930 fall season when he scored five goals in six games. He played another eight games in the 1931 spring season after which the Wanderers withdrew from the league and ceased operations. He later moved to the Kearny Scots of the American Soccer League. In 1934, he tied Archie Stark as the ASL goal scoring leader. In 1939, he was listed with Brookhattan. He also played for the Philadelphia Americans, winning the 1942 ASL title with the Americans, and Brooklyn Hispano.

Henry had Irish ancestry as his mother Mary Dowling came from Listowel, County Kerry, Ireland.
