= Jack Calder =

Scottish footballer

Personal information
- Place of birth: Scotland
- Position: Forward

Senior career*
Years	Team	Apps	(Gls)
1948–????	Kearny Scots		
- Newark Portuguese
1955	New York Brookhattan		
- * Club domestic league appearances and goals

Jack Calder was a Scottish football forward who played seven seasons in the American Soccer League.

Calder began his career in Scotland. In 1948, he moved to the Kearny Scots of the American Soccer League. In 1948, the Scots won the Lewis Cup. He then moved to Newark Portuguese where he led the league in scoring during the 1953–54 American Soccer League season. In 1955, he played for New York Brookhattan.
