= 1950 National Challenge Cup =

Football cup championship in the United States

- Dewar Challenge Cup

Tournament details
- Country: United States

Final positions
- Champions: Simpkins-Ford
- Runners-up: Ponta Delgada

The 1950 National Challenge Cup was the 36th edition of the United States Soccer Football Association's annual open cup. Today, the tournament is known as the Lamar Hunt U.S. Open Cup. Teams from the American Soccer League II competed in the tournament, based on qualification methods in their base region.

St. Louis Simpkins-Ford won the tournament for their second time, by defeating Ponta Delgada S.C. of Fall River, Massachusetts in a two-legged final, 2-0 and 1-1.

Club	State	Region
AAC Eagles	Illinois	Chicago
Brookhattan	New York	Brooklyn–Manhattan
Castle Shannon	Pennsylvania	Pittsburgh
Morgan Strasser	Pennsylvania	Morgan Township
Ponta Delgada	Massachusetts	Fall River
Simpkins-Ford	Missouri	St. Louis
Philadelphia Nationals	Pennsylvania	Philadelphia

== Bracket ==
Quarterfinals
Brookhattan	2	0	2
Ponta Delgada	4	0	4
Philadelphia Nationals	1	1	2
Uhrik Truckers	0	0	0
AAC Eagles	0	0	0
Simpkins-Ford	0	5	5
Morgan Strasser	2	0	2
Castle Shannon	0	0	0

Semifinals
Ponta Delgada	1	2	3
Philadelphia Nationals	1	1	2
Simpkins-Ford	4	2	6
Morgan Strasser	1	0	1

Finals
Ponta Delgada	0	1	1
Simpkins-Ford	2	1	3
