= 1932–33 American Soccer League =

American Soccer League -1932–33 Season-
- Season: 1932–33
- Champions: First half: Fall River; Second half: Brookhattan

Statistics of American Soccer League in the 1932-33 season.

== Overview ==
This was the last season for the first American Soccer League. After the disastrous 1932 season, the league began a 1932–1933 season in October 1932. Although it began well, with nine teams competing, the turmoil from earlier in the year continued as several teams withdrew during the first half and others during the mid-season break. At that point, the historical record becomes contradictory. The league may have intended the season to run from the fall of 1932 into the spring of 1933. However, a May 29, 1933, New York Times story has this headline: "Brookhattan Beats Americans At Soccer: Triumphs by 2-1 to Capture Honors for First Half of League Competition". This implies the possibility the league had abandoned the 1932–1933 season and tried to begin again in May 1933 with a full spring–fall season. Regardless, the league collapsed in the summer of 1933, to be replaced by the semi-professional American Soccer League that fall.

== League standings ==
=== First half ===
Place	Team	GP	W	D	L	PTS
1	Fall River F.C.	19	10	7	2	27
2	Pawtucket Rangers	19	10	5	4	25
3	New York Americans	11	6	3	3	14
4	New York Field Club	11	5	1	5	11
5	Brooklyn Wanderers	15	5	2	8	12
6	Hakoah All-Stars	15	4	4	7	12
7	Queens Bohemians	9	2	3	4	5
8	New Bedford Whalers	6	2	0	4	4
9	Boston Bears	11	2	2	7	6

=== Second half ===
Place	Team	GP	W	D	L	GF	GA	PTS
1	Brookhattan	6	4	1	1	11	7	9
2	New York Americans	6	4	0	2	19	10	8
3	Brooklyn Wanderers	6	3	1	2	9	11	7
4	Prague Americans	5	0	0	5	3	13	0
5	Queens Bohemians	1	0	0	1	2	3	0
