= Bethlehem Hungarian =

Bethlehem Hungarian was an American soccer club based in Bethlehem, Pennsylvania that was a member of the American Soccer League.

After their first season the team moved to Allentown, Pennsylvania but folded early in the season.

== Year-by-year ==
Year	Division	League	Reg. season	Playoffs	U.S. Open Cup
1938-39	N/A	ASL	7th, American	Did not qualify	?
1939-40	N/A	ASL	Folded early in season	N/A	N/A
