= Richard Roberts (American soccer) =

20th-century soccer player

Dick Roberts
Personal information
- Full name: Richard Roberts
- Place of birth: United States

Senior career*
Years	Team	Apps	(Gls)
1948–1949	New York Americans		
1949–1953	Kearny Scots		
1953–1955	Brooklyn Hispano		

International career
1952	United States	1	(0)
- * Club domestic league appearances and goals

Richard Roberts is an American former soccer forward who played professionally in the American Soccer League and earned one cap with the U.S. national team.

== Professional ==
In 1948–49 he played for New York Americans, notably scoring a goal in both of the championship playoff tie breakers of that season. In 1949, Roberts signed with the Kearny Scots of the American Soccer League. In 1952, he led the league in scoring with nineteen goals. In 1953, he played with Brooklyn Hispano.

== National team ==
On April 30, 1952, Roberts earned his lone cap with the U.S. national team in a 6–0 loss to Scotland.
