= Chappie Sheppell =

American soccer player (1914–1985)

Personal information
- Full name: Charles Frederick Sheppell
- Date of birth: May 1, 1914
- Place of birth: Kearny, New Jersey, US
- Date of death: November 29, 1985 (aged 71)
- Place of death: Point Pleasant, New Jersey, US
- Position: Forward

Senior career*
Years	Team	Apps	(Gls)
1934–	Kearny Scots		
–1950	Kearny Irish		
- * Club domestic league appearances and goals

Chappie Sheppell (May 1, 1914 – November 29, 1985) was an American soccer forward who led the American Soccer League in scoring in 1943. He was a member of the 1936 US Olympic soccer team.

Sheppell was born Charles Frederick Sheppell on May 1, 1914, in Kearny, New Jersey.

Sheppell began playing professionally in the American Soccer League in 1934 for the Kearny Scots. In 1942, he finished fifth in the scoring table with twelve goals in seventeen games while playing for the Kearny Irish. In 1943, he topped the charts with twelve goals and fourteen assists in fifteen games. In 1950, the Irish finished runner-up to the Philadelphia Nationals. Sheppell retired at the end of the season.

Sheppell played for the Kearny Condons baseball team between 1936 and 1940. From 1940 to 1945, he played for the Top Hatters of Kearny softball team.

Sheppell married Glasgow-born Margaret Jenkins. The couple had two daughters and four grandsons.

Sheppell died in Point Pleasant, New Jersey on November 29, 1985, at the age of 71.
