= Lewis Cup =

- Organizer(s): Blue Mountain League (1915–19); American Soccer League I (1925–30); American Soccer League II (1940–63)
- Founded: 1915
- Abolished: 1963; 63 years ago
- Region: Lehigh Valley, PA
- Last champion: Newark Ukrainian Sitch (1963)
- Most championships: Uhrik Truckers (4 titles)

The Lewis Cup was an American soccer trophy established in 1914 as the championship trophy for the amateur Blue Mountain League, which was composed of clubs from the Lehigh Valley region of northeastern Pennsylvania. It was later awarded to the winners of the American Soccer League's League Cup. The last winner received the trophy in 1963 and it resides in the Museum of Sports Glory in Kyiv, Ukraine.

== History ==
In 1914, Horace Edgar Lewis donated a trophy to crown the champion of the newly established Blue Mountain League. When the league disbanded, the trophy was stored in a jewelry store safe. In December 1924, was brought out of storage in order to award to the winners of the 1925 American Soccer League cup. The league began to collapse in 1931 and did not hold a league cup. In 1933, the league disbanded. That year, a semi-professional league, the second American Soccer League, began operations. In 1940, the Lewis Cup was again brought out of storage and given to the winners of the league cup. In 1963, Newark Ukrainian Stich won the cup, the last season it was awarded. The team later donated the trophy to the Museum of Sports Glory in Kyiv.

== Winners ==
=== Blue Mountain League ===
Year	Winner	Runner-up
1915	Bethlehem Reserves	Nativity Men's Club
1916	Allentown YMCA	–
1917	Allentown YMCA (2)	Nativity Men's Club (Note: The league was reduced from six to two teams half way through the season when most of the players were drafted into military service when the United States entered World War I. The remaining two teams, Victor FC and North End FC played three games to determine the Lewis Cup champion. North End won two of the three games.)
1918	North End F.C.	Victor F.C.
1919	North End F.C. (2)	Saucon Cross Roads

=== American Soccer League I ===
Year	Winner	Runner-up
1925; Details	Boston Soccer Club	Fall River F.C.
1926; Details	New Bedford Whalers	New York Giants
1927; Details	Boston Soccer Club (2)	Brooklyn Wanderers
1928; Details	Bethlehem Steel	Boston Soccer Club
1929; Details	New York Nationals	New Bedford Whalers
1930; Details	Fall River F.C.	Hakoah All-Stars
1931-1933	No competition	

=== American Soccer League II ===
Year	Winner	Runner-up
1934-1939	No competition	
1940	Kearny Scots	Philadelphia German American
1941	Philadelphia German-American	Brookhattan
1942	Brookhattan	Kearny Irish
1943	Philadelphia Americans (2)	Kearny Irish
1944	Kearny Irish	Brooklyn Wanderers
1945	Brookhattan (2)	Brooklyn Wanderers
1946	Brooklyn Hispano	Baltimore Americans
1947	Baltimore Americans	Kearny Irish
1948	Kearny Scots (2)	Brookhattan
1949	Philadelphia Nationals	Kearny Irish
1950	New York Americans	Philadelphia Nationals
1951	Philadelphia Nationals (2)	New York Hakoah
1952	Philadelphia Nationals (3)	New York Americans
1953	Newark Portuguese	Philadelphia Nationals
1954	Newark Sport Club	S.C. Eintracht
1955	Uhrik Truckers (3)	Brookhattan
1956	No competition	
1957	Elizabeth Falcons	Newark Portuguese
1958	Uhrik Truckers (4)	Ukrainian Nationals
1959	Ukrainian Nationals	New York Hakoah
1960-1962	No competition	
1963	Newark Ukrainian Sitch	Ukrainian Nationals

=== By club ===
Club	Appearances	Cups won	Runner-up	Years won	Years runner-up
Uhrik Truckers#	5	4	1	1941, 1943, 1955, 1958	1940
Philadelphia Nationals	5	3	2	1949, 1951, 1952	1950, 1953
Brookhattan	5	2	3	1942, 1945	1941, 1948, 1955
Boston S.C.	3	2	1	1925, 1927	1928
Allentown YMCA	2	2	0	1916, 1917	–
North End F.C.	2	2	0	1918, 1919	–
Kearny Scots	2	2	0	1940, 1948	–
Kearny Irish	5	1	4	1944	1942, 1943, 1947, 1949
Ukrainian Nationals	3	1	2	1959	1958, 1963
Fall River F.C.	2	1	1	1930	1925
New Bedford Whalers	2	1	1	1926	1929
Baltimore Americans	2	1	1	1947	1946
New York Americans	2	1	1	1950	1952
Newark Portuguese	2	1	1	1953	1957
Bethlehem Reserves	1	1	0	1915	–
Bethlehem Steel	1	1	0	1928	–
New York Nationals	1	1	0	1929	–
Brooklyn Hispano	1	1	0	1946	–
Newark Sport Club	1	1	0	1954	–
Elizabeth Falcons	1	1	0	1957	–
Newark Ukrainian Sitch	1	1	0	1963	–
Nativity Men's Club	2	0	2	–	1915, 1917
Brooklyn Wanderers	2	0	2	–	1944, 1945
New York Hakoah II	2	0	2	–	1951, 1959
Victor F.C.	1	0	1	–	1918
Saucon Cross Roads	1	0	1	–	1919
New York Giants	1	0	1	–	1926
Brooklyn Wanderers	1	0	1	–	1927
Hakoah All-Stars	1	0	1	–	1930
S.C. Eintracht	1	0	1	–	1954

#1941 known as Philadelphia German-American, 1943 as Philadelphia Americans
