= Alex Rae (American soccer) =

American soccer player

Alexander “Alex” Rae is a former U.S. soccer player who spent ten seasons in the American Soccer League (ASL). He began playing professionally in 1934 with the Newark Germans. In 1935, he scored sixteen goals in nineteen games with the Germans. The next season, he led the ASL in scoring with twenty-eight goals. In 1937, he moved to the Kearny Scots where he won the ASL title every season between 1937 and 1941. He continued to play with the Scots until at least 1946.

In 1937, Rae earned three caps with the U.S. national team. The U.S. national team had not played a game since 1934, and would not play again for another ten years. However, in its three 1937 games, Rae scored in each one, all defeats to Mexico.
