= George Conn (soccer) =

American soccer player

Senior career*
Years	Team	Apps	(Gls)
1933–1945	Kearny Scots		
- * Club domestic league appearances and goals

George Conn was an American soccer player who spent twelve seasons with the Kearny Scots in the American Soccer League. During those twelve seasons, the Scots won five league titles (1937, 1938, 1939, 1940 and 1941). In 1939, he was part of an ASL All Star team which played the Scotland national team during its tour North American.
