= Manhattan Brewing Company of Chicago =

- Location: Chicago, Illinois, USA
- Opened: 1893
- Closed: 1968

The Manhattan Brewing Company was a brewery founded in Chicago, United States in 1893 which had associations with organized crime during and after prohibition. Manhattan later changed its name to the Canadian Ace Brewing Company and operated as such through the 1950s and 1960s until closing in 1968.

== History ==
Chicago mobster Johnny Torrio and partner veteran brewing magnate Joseph Stenson (of Stenson Brewing Company) purchased Manhattan in 1919. Not long after the purchase, Al Capone's employee Louis Greenberg assumed management responsibilities and also took partial ownership. During Prohibition, Greenberg reorganized the brewery under a new name, Malt Maid, and in 1925 the name was changed yet again to Fort Dearborn Products Company. Despite the new names, intended to distance the company from the brewing industry, beer was secretly produced on the premises and the brewery was occasionally searched. In 1932, with Greenberg's help, Chicago mob boss Frank Nitti purchased the brewery which returned to regular beer production after prohibition was repealed. In 1933 the company name was changed from Fort Dearborn back to Manhattan Brewing and Arthur Lueder was installed as President.

Until January 1936, Manhattan Brewing confined distribution to the states immediately adjacent to Illinois. During that period, "Old Manhattan" was their flagship brand. With the advent of the Keglined beer can, Manhattan dramatically expanded their distribution and brand offerings and in 1938, Manhattan boasted of being second only to the Pabst Brewing Company in canned beer production.

Manhattan had legal difficulties with federal authorities after Prohibition, mainly for deceptive marketing that suggested beer produced at their brewery in Chicago was actually produced by other breweries, or in different locations. The Annual Report Of The Federal Trade Commission For The Fiscal Year Ended June 30, 1944 mentions a case "Manhattan Brewing Co., Chicago.--Seventh Circuit (Chicago), misleading use of words "Canadian" and "Wisconsin" in brand or trade names for beer or ale not brewed in Canada or Wisconsin." The Canadian (Ace) issue continued through 1946.

When Nitti died in 1943, he owned 85 percent of the stock in Manhattan and also owned an interest in the Prima-Bismark brewing company.

Manhattan changed their name to Canadian Ace effective January 2, 1947, and discontinued producing any brands bearing Manhattan in the name. However, the link to organized crime remained as Lou Greenberg was a principal owner of the Canadian Ace Brewing Company.

As Canadian Ace, the brewery used various brewery names on their cans matching the label or brand (Essex was Essex Brewery Ltd., Jester was the Jester Brewing Co., and so on. The Canadian Ace produced brewery closed in 1968 and the building was demolished in 1976.

== Athletic sponsorship ==
The brewery sponsored the Chicago Manhattan Beer soccer team, one of the top midwest teams in the early twentieth century. Such great players as Fabri Salcedo and Billy Gonsalves spent time with the team which won the 1938 Peel Cup and finished runner up in the 1939 National Challenge Cup.
