= New York F.C. =

New York F.C. may refer to:

- New York Field Club (founded 1916), two early 20th-century American soccer clubs
- New York City Football Club (founded 2013), an American soccer club
- F.C. New York (2011–2012), an American soccer club

== See also ==
- Brooklyn F.C. (New York), an American soccer club based in Brooklyn, New York
