= Sol Eisner =

American association footballer

Personal information
- Place of birth: Germany
- Position: Forward

Sol Eisner is an American former soccer player who played as a forward. Eisner played in the American Soccer League, and on the United States men's national soccer team.

== Biography ==
Eisner was born in Germany, and is Jewish. He had four brothers who also played soccer.

Eisner was a star with the New York Americans most seasons from 1937 to 1951, during which time the team was in the American Soccer League. In 1946–47 he scored 14 of the team's 38 goals for the season. He played 60 games for the team in his career, started 58 of them, and scored 79 goals.

By July 1942 he was in the US military where he lost his left eye during army maneuvers. He played for the American Soccer League All Stars in 1947, nearly scoring in a 2–0 loss to Hapoel at Yankee Stadium in front of more than 40,000 fans.

He played an unofficial international game for the United States national team, in 1948 against Israel, and played for the American Soccer League All-Stars in a tour of Israel in 1951.

Eisner would later play for New York's Maccabi F.C. in the mid-1950s.
