= Frank Muniz =

Frank Muniz may refer to:

- Frankie Muniz (born 1985), American actor
- Frank Moniz (1911–2004), U.S. soccer player
