= Charlie Ernst =

American soccer player

Personal information
- Full name: Charles Ernst
- Position: Forward

Senior career*
| Years | Team | Apps | (Gls) |
| 1936– | Baltimore S.C. | | |
| –1946 | Baltimore Americans | | |
| 1946–1948 | Baltimore S.C. | | |
- * Club domestic league appearances and goals

Charlie Ernst was a U.S. soccer forward who led the American Soccer League in scoring in 1937 and 1940.

In 1936, Ernst signed with Baltimore S.C. in the American Soccer League. He promptly led the league in scoring with 25 goals. He played with Baltimore S.C. through at least 1940 when he led the league in scoring again, with 24 goals this time. That year, Baltimore shared the 1940 National Challenge Cup title with Chicago Sparta after the teams played to two consecutive ties. Ernst scored in the second game. He later moved to the Baltimore Americans. In 1946, he left the Americans to rejoin Baltimore SC which had faded badly in the intervening years. Despite Ernst's presence, the team finished the league at the bottom of the standings. He retired at the end of the 1947–1948 season.

He was inducted into the Maryland Soccer Hall of Fame in 1995.
