= James Robertson (soccer) =

American soccer player

James Mearns Robertson (23 March 1891 – 9 October 1948) was an American soccer full back who played the first two U.S. national team games in 1916.

Robertson was born in New York City. In 1916, Robertson was with Brooklyn Celtic of the New York Amateur Association Football League when he was called up to the national team. From at least 1918 to at least 1920, he played with Robins Dry Dock. In 1919, he joined Bethlehem Steel F.C. for that team's Scandinavian tour.

== National team ==
Robertson earned two caps with the national team in 1916. In the first official U.S. national team game, the U.S. defeated Sweden on August 20, 1916. On September 3, 1916, Robertson and his teammates tied Norway before returning to the U.S.
