= 1951 National Challenge Cup =

- Dewar Challenge Cup

Tournament details
- Country: United States
- Dates: March 11 – June 17, 1951

Final positions
- Champions: New York German–Hungarian S.C. (1st title)
- Runners-up: Heidelberg S.C.
- Semifinalists: Sparta; Philadelphia Nationals

The 1951 National Challenge Cup was the 38th edition of the USSFA's annual open soccer championship. The German Hungarian S.C. from Eastern New York defeated the Pittsburgh Heidelberg in a two-leg final to win. The Heidelberg manager later filed a protest with the United States Soccer Football Association, specifically regarding the "inefficient and partial" officials.
