= Fabri Salcedo =

Spanish-born American footballer

Personal information
- Full name: Fabriciano Salcedo
- Date of birth: May 28, 1914
- Place of birth: Santander, Cantabria, Spain
- Date of death: August 25, 1985 (aged 71)
- Place of death: Rochelle Park, New Jersey, United States
- Height: 5 ft 10 in (1.78 m)
- Position: Forward

Senior career*
Years	Team	Apps	(Gls)
- Segura F.C.
- Madrid F.C.
–1934	Portuguese Victoria F.C.		
1934–1938	Brooklyn Hispano		
1938–1939	Chicago Manhattan Beer		
1939	Kearny Scots	1	(0)
1939	Danish Americans		
1939–1947	Brooklyn Hispano		
1947–1948	Philadelphia Americans		
- * Club domestic league appearances and goals

Fabriciano “Fabri” Salcedo (May 28, 1914 – August 25, 1985) was a Spanish-born American soccer forward. Salcedo spent thirteen seasons in the American Soccer League, leading the league in scoring three of those seasons, one season in the St. Louis Soccer League and part of one season in the National Soccer League of Chicago. He is a member of the National Soccer Hall of Fame.

== Early career ==
Salcedo was born in Spain and played with several youth teams before moving to the United States in May 1929. He played with a string of amateur clubs playing in city leagues, including Segura F.C. (Metropolitan League of New York City), Madrid F.C. and Portuguese Victoria F.C. (Westchester County League). When Portuguese Victoria won the 1934 league title, Salcedo came to the attention of Duncan Othen, coach of the American Soccer League club Brooklyn Hispano.

== Brooklyn Hispano ==
In 1934, Salcedo signed with Hispano and would play most of his career with the Brooklyn team, beginning as a center forward before moving to right forward. While with Hispano, Salcedo would play with Walter Bahr. In his first season, Salcedo scored eleven goals, putting him sixth on the league's scoring list. This led to his selection to the United States men's national soccer team for an unofficial game with Scotland on May 19, 1935. In 1937, Hispano played in the ASL title game, only to fall to the Kearny Scots.

== Chicago ==
On September 9, 1938, Chicago Manhattan Beer purchased Salcedo's contract for $500. In Chicago, he joined Billy Gonsalves, another future Hall of Famer. In the 1938–1939 season, Manhattan Beer played in the St. Louis Soccer League which had invited several Chicago teams to join the league. Manhattan finished second in the league standings. The team also went to the National Challenge Cup final before falling to Brooklyn St. Mary's Celtic.

In September 1939, Salcedo signed with the Kearny Scots (ASL). He played one game, against Hispano. However, Hispano disputed Salcedo's signing with the Scots, claiming they still owned his rights in the ASL. The US Football Association agreed with Hispano and nullified Salcedo's contract with the Scots. Salcedo returned to Manhattan Beer for the start of the 1939-1940 St. Louis Soccer League season. However, he then jumped to the Danish-Americans of the National Soccer League of Chicago. He played only briefly with the Danish-Americans before moving back east to sign with Hispano.

== Brooklyn Hispano ==
Beginning in 1939, Salcedo would play the next eight seasons with Hispano. While Salcedo is best known for his goal scoring exploits, he did play part of one game in 1941 in goal. That season, he dropped to ninth in the end of year goals list after missing part of the season with a leg injury. Hispano won its only league title in 1942–1943. They also won the National Challenge Cup, giving Salcedo and his teammates a “double”. Hispano repeated as National Challenge Cup champions the next year. At the start of the 1947–1948 season, Hispano released Salcedo and he signed with the Philadelphia Americans. That season, Salcedo won his last championship when the Americans took the ASL title.

== Non-soccer career ==
Salcedo worked a variety of manual labor jobs in addition to his soccer career. When he moved to Chicago Manhattan Beer in 1938, he worked in the Manhattan Beer brewery. After returning to Brooklyn in 1939, he was hired by Federal Shipyard and Drydock where he became a machinist in 1940. In 1946, he left Federal to join the Engineering & Research Division of the ITT Continental Baking Company. He retired in 1979.

He was married with two children and four grandchildren.

He was posthumously inducted into the National Soccer Hall of Fame in 2005.

== Honors ==
League titles 1943, 1948

National Cup titles 1943, 1944

Leading goal scorer 1937–1938, 1940–1941, 1945–1946
