= Frank Moniz =

American soccer player

Frankie Moniz
Personal information
- Full name: Frank Moniz
- Date of birth: September 26, 1911
- Place of birth: Fall River, Massachusetts, United States
- Date of death: June 18, 2004 (aged 92)
- Place of death: Fall River, Massachusetts, United States
- Position: Forward

Senior career*
| Years | Team | Apps | (Gls) |
| 1935– | Kearny Scots | | |
| –1941 | Pawtucket Rangers | | |
| 1941– | Ponta Delgada S.C. | | |

International career
| 1947 | United States | 2 | (0) |
- * Club domestic league appearances and goals

Frankie "Shorty" Moniz (misspelled Muniz and Munitz) (September 26, 1911 – June 18, 2004) was an American soccer player who spent six seasons in the American Soccer League and earned two caps with the U.S. national team.

In 1935, Moniz signed with the Kearny Scots in the American Soccer League. At some point he moved to the Pawtucket Rangers. In 1941, he left the ASL and joined the Fall River, Massachusetts Ponta Delgada S.C. which won the 1947 National Challenge Cup and National Amateur Cup. Based on these result, the U.S. Soccer Federation selected the club to act as the U.S. national team at the 1947 NAFC Championship. As a result, Moniz earned two caps with the U.S. national team. In the first game, the U.S. 5-0 to Mexico and in the second, they lost 5–2 to Cuba.

Moniz served in the U.S. Army during World War II and later owned a Sunoco gas station. He was inducted into the New England Soccer Hall of Fame in 1984.
