= 1954 National Challenge Cup =

- Dewar Challenge Cup

Tournament details
- Country: United States
- Dates: 6 December 1953 – 16 May 1954

Final positions
- Champions: New York Americans (2nd title)
- Runners-up: St. Louis Kutis S.C.
- Semifinalists: Scots SC; Castle Shannon

The 1954 National Challenge Cup was the 41st edition of the United States Soccer Football Association's annual open soccer championship.
