= Pito Villanon =

Cuban footballer

Personal information
- Place of birth: Cuba
- Position: Striker

Senior career*
Years	Team	Apps	(Gls)
1948–1958	Brookhattan		
- * Club domestic league appearances and goals

Pito Villanon was a Cuban football player who spent eleven seasons with Brookhattan in the American Soccer League. At the time, he was one of a handful of black professional athletes, playing in an integrated American sports league. He is reputedly the first black player in the American Soccer League.

During his eleven seasons in the ASL, Villanon led the league in scoring twice (1948-49, 1952-53). He was also the 1952-53 ASL MVP. In 1948, Villanon and his teammates finished runner-up in the 1948 National Challenge Cup. They also finished runner-up in league play in 1954.
