= Nicholas Kropfelder =

American soccer player and referee

Nick Kropfelder
Personal information
- Full name: Nicholas F. Kropfelder
- Date of birth: February 19, 1923
- Place of birth: Baltimore, Maryland, United States
- Date of death: August 4, 2012 (aged 60)
- Place of death: Maryland, United States
- Position: Center forward

Youth career
- 1947: Loyola Greyhounds

Senior career*
Years	Team	Apps	(Gls)
1941–1942	Santa Maria K of C		
1942–1943	Baltimore Americans		
1946–1948	Baltimore Americans		
1948–1953	Philadelphia Nationals		
1953–1954	Baltimore Rockets		
- * Club domestic league appearances and goals

Nicholas "Nick" Kropfelder (February 19, 1923 - August 4, 2012) was an American soccer center forward. He played professionally in the American Soccer League, leading the league twice in scoring. He was inducted into the National Soccer Hall of Fame in 1996.

== Playing career ==
Kropfelder grew up in Baltimore where he played baseball, basketball, and soccer at Mount Saint Joseph College, a secondary school, from 1938 to 1940. In soccer, he was a high scoring centerforward. From 1941 to 1942, then played for Santa Maria K of C in the Baltimore Catholic soccer league. From September to November 1941, he went on trial with Baltimore SC of the American Soccer League, but returned to Santa Maria as it made a run to the semifinals of the 1942 National Amateur Cup. In the fall of 1942, he signed as an amateur with the Baltimore Americans of the ASL. His younger brother Charley played for the Americans during this time as well. In 1943, Kropfelder's career was interrupted by military service during World War II and he didn't return to the Americans until 1946. In addition to playing for the Americans, he also attended Loyola College where he played on the school's soccer team in 1947. Kropfelder and his teammates dominated the Mason-Dixon Conference and Kropfelder was named as an Honorable Mention (third team) All American. However, he was stripped of his collegiate eligibility based on his time as a professional with the Americans. Kropfelder led the ASL in scoring during the 1947–1948 season with 19 goals. In 1948, he moved to the Philadelphia Nationals and played with them through the end of the 1952–1953 season. He led the league in scoring for a second time with seventeen goals in 1950–1951. In addition to his personal achievements, he also won the 1950 and 1951 league titles, 1951, 1952 and 1953 league cups. He was also part of two teams which lost the National Challenge Cup championship (1949 and 1952). He finished his career with one season with the Baltimore Rockets before retiring in 1954.

== Post-playing career ==
After retiring from playing professionally, Kropfelder served as both an NCAA and amateur referee for several decades. In 1993, he was elected president of the Maryland Old Timers Soccer Association in 1993.

Kropfelder was inducted into the National Soccer Hall of Fame in 1996.
