= John O'Connell (soccer) =

American soccer player (died 1988)

Harp O'Connell
Personal information
- Full name: John O'Connell
- Place of birth: United States
- Date of death: 1988
- Place of death: United States
- Positions: Defender; forward

Senior career*
Years	Team	Apps	(Gls)
1946–1947	Brooklyn Wanderers		
1948–1956	New York Americans		
1956	New York Hakoah		

International career
1949–1952	United States	4	(0)
- * Club domestic league appearances and goals

John "Harp" O'Connell (died 1988) was an American soccer player. He spent his professional career in the American Soccer League where he was a two-time league MVP. O'Connell also earned four caps with the U.S. national team between 1949 and 1954.

== Club career ==
O'Connell spent ten seasons in the American Soccer League (ASL), first as a defender before moving to the front line. In 1946, O'Connell signed with the Brooklyn Wanderers before moving to the New York Americans in 1948. In 1947, he scored sixteen goals in fifteen games with the Wanderers. O'Connell experienced his greatest personal success when he was named the league MVP in both 1948 and 1949. In 1950, he was with the U.S. Army, fighting in the Korean War. After returning to the U.S., he rejoined the Americans which won the 1954 ASL and National Challenge Cup titles. In 1956, the Americans merged with Brooklyn Hakoah to form New York Hakoah. He finished his career in 1956 with Hakoak.

== National team ==
O'Connell earned four caps with the U.S. national team between 1949 and 1954. His first game with the national team came as a forward in a June 19, 1949 loss to Scotland. He did not play with the national team again until another loss to Scotland on April 20, 1952. In that game, he had moved to the back line and contributed an own goal to Scotland's win. In January 1954, he played two World Cup qualifiers, both losses to Mexico.
