= St. Louis Mules =

American soccer club

The St. Louis Mules was an American soccer club that was a member of the American Soccer League. Later in the 1972 season, the team became the St. Louis Frogs.

== Year-by-year ==
Year	Division	League	Reg. season	Playoffs	U.S. Open Cup
1972	2	ASL	5th, Midwestern	Did not qualify	Did not enter
