= John Nanoski =

American soccer player

Jukey Nanoski
Personal information
- Full name: John Nanoski
- Date of birth: June 23, 1918
- Place of birth: Philadelphia, Pennsylvania, United States
- Date of death: August 14, 2011 (aged 93)
- Place of death: Surprise, Arizona, United States
- Position: Center forward

Youth career
- Kensington Quoit Club

Senior career*
Years	Team	Apps	(Gls)
1937–1938	Kensington Blue Bells	?	(54)
1938–1942	Brooklyn St. Mary's Celtic		
1942–1948	Philadelphia Americans		
1948	Brooklyn Wanderers		
- Trenton Highlanders
- * Club domestic league appearances and goals

John “Duke” or “Jukey” Nanoski (June 23, 1918 – August 14, 2011) was a former U.S. soccer center forward who spent most of his career in the American Soccer League. He led the league in scoring twice. He was one of only two players inducted into the National Soccer Hall of Fame in 1993, the other being Pelé.

== Youth ==
Nanoski grew up in Philadelphia, Pennsylvania, where he attended Stetson High School. While growing up he played for several youth clubs, the Philadelphia Athletic Club, Westmoreland S.C., and Lehigh S.C. When he was sixteen he joined a lower division amateur city team by the name of the Kensington Quoit Club. Over two season, the team rose through the third, then second division. That led to Nanoski turning professional in 1937.

== Professional ==
In 1937, Nanoski joined the Kensington Blue Bells in the Pennsylvania League. He scored 54 goals as the Blue Bells won the 1938 league title. That brought him to the attention of the professionals which led to his signing with Brooklyn St. Mary's Celtic of the American Soccer League. Brooklyn finished second in the league that season, but won the 1939 National Challenge Cup 5–1 on aggregate in the two-game series over Chicago's Bricklayers and Masons F.C. Nanoski scored three of Brooklyn's goals, including the game winner in the 1–0 away victory in Chicago. Nanoski led the league in scoring with twenty goals in the 1941–1942 season. However, Brooklyn could not capitalize on his production and finished at the bottom of the standings. The team folded following the season and Nanoski moved to the Philadelphia Americans. He again led the league in scoring during the 1944–1945 season. He played with the Americans through the 1947–1948 season, winning the league title in 1944, 1947 and 1948. In 1948, he joined the Brooklyn Wanderers, but the team folded one game into the season. According to the National Soccer Hall of Fame, Nanoski played with the Trenton Highlanders at some point in his career. The Highlanders spent the 1938–1939 season in the ASL, and existed as an amateur club before that.

Nanoski was inducted into the National Soccer Hall of Fame in 1993.
