= Brooklyn F.C. (1933–1934) =

American soccer club (1933–1934)

Brooklyn F.C. was an American soccer club based in Brooklyn, New York, which was an inaugural member of the reformed American Soccer League.

After 12 games of the 1933/34 ASL season the team merged with Hispano F.C. The aggregation was renamed Brooklyn Hispano Football Club and began play on January 21, 1934 and assumed the record of Hispano F.C. in the standings.

== Year-by-year ==
Year	Division	League	Reg. season	Playoffs	U.S. Open Cup
1933-34	N/A	ASL	Played 12 games: 4 Wins; 6 Losses; 2 Draws	N/A	N/A
