= Peter Millar (soccer) =

American soccer player

Personal information
- Place of birth: Scotland
- Position: Forward

Youth career
- 1957-1958: Kilwinning Rangers

Senior career*
Years	Team	Apps	(Gls)
1960–1961	Inter S.C.		
1961–1962	→ Inter-Brooklyn Italians		
1962–1964	→ Boca Juniors		
1964–1968	New York Inter		
1969	Baltimore Bays		
1969–1972	New York Inter Giuliana		

International career
1968–1972	United States	13	(9)
- * Club domestic league appearances and goals

Peter Millar is a retired soccer player who played as a forward. He spent nine seasons in the second American Soccer League, one in the North American Soccer League and four in the German American Soccer League. Born in Scotland, he earned thirteen caps and scored eight goals for the United States national team between 1968 and 1972.

== National team ==
Millar earned thirteen caps for the U.S. national team between 1968 and 1972, scoring 8 goals (or 9 depending on the sources) during that time. He made an auspicious debut with the team by scoring a hat trick in a September 15, 1968 tie with Israel. Some records only attribute 2 goals to Millar as he and Willy Roy apparently kicked the ball nearly simultaneously which leads to the discrepancy in his stats.

=== International Goals ===
#	Date	Venue	Opponent	Score	Result	Competition
1	September 15, 1968	New York, New York	Israel	2–3	3–3	Friendly
2	September 15, 1968	New York, New York	Israel	3–3	3–3	Friendly
3	October 20, 1968	Port-au-Prince, Haiti	Haiti	?	6–3	Friendly
4	October 20, 1968	Port-au-Prince, Haiti	Haiti	?	6–3	Friendly
5	October 20, 1968	Port-au-Prince, Haiti	Haiti	?		Friendly
6	October 21, 1968	Port-au-Prince, Haiti	Haiti	?	2-5	Friendly
7	November 2, 1968	Kansas City, Missouri	Bermuda	1–0	6–2	1970 World Cup Qualifying
8	November 2, 1968	Kansas City, Missouri	Bermuda	5–2	6–2	1970 World Cup Qualifying
9	November 2, 1968	Kansas City, Missouri	Bermuda	6–2	6–2	1970 World Cup Qualifying

== See also ==
- List of United States men's international soccer players born outside the United States
