= Trenton Americans =

Trenton Americans were an American soccer club based in Trenton, New Jersey, who were members of the American Soccer League. After the 1947/48 season, the American Soccer League franchise of the Baltimore S.C. was purchased and moved to Trenton to become the Trenton Americans. After losing their playing field, the club was allowed to withdraw from the league following the 1950/51 season.

== Year-by-year ==
Year	Division	League	Reg. season	Playoffs	U.S. Open Cup
1948/49	N/A	ASL	8th	Did not qualify	?
1949/50	N/A	ASL	7th	No playoff	?
1950/51	N/A	ASL	7th	No playoff	?
1953/54	N/A	ASL	6th	Did not qualify	?
1954/55	N/A	ASL	7th	No playoff	?
