= Fall River S.C. =

Fall River S.C. was an American soccer club based in Fall River, Massachusetts that was a member of the American Soccer League.

== Year-by-year ==
Year	Division	League	Reg. season	Playoffs	U.S. Open Cup
1957/58	N/A	ASL	5th	No playoff	?
1958/59	N/A	ASL	6th	No playoff	Final
1959/60	N/A	ASL	6th	No playoff	Semifinals
1960/61	N/A	ASL	4th	No playoff	Quarterfinals
1961/62	N/A	ASL	4th	No playoff	Quarterfinals
1962/63	N/A	ASL	3rd	No playoff	Quarterfinals
