= Gremio Lusitano =

- Full name: Gremio Lusitano
- Founded: 1922
- Stadium: Lusitano Stadium
- Capacity: 3,000
- President: Celso Correira
- League: Connecticut Soccer League
- Website: https://gremiolusitano.com/

Gremio Lusitano is an amateur soccer team from Ludlow, Massachusetts.

Founded in 1922 in a garage on Franklin Street, the team had competed for several seasons during the 1930s in the New England Division of the American Soccer League, but for most of its existence it has been an amateur or semi-professional club. John Palhete was the team's first coach and they play their home games in Lusitano Stadium, which is owned by the club. The name of the club is a rough translation of "Portuguese Union".

== Teams founded ==
=== Ludlow Lusitano ===
Besides the name Gremio Lusitano, during its history, the club also used different names. In the 1937–38 American Soccer League, the club played as Lusitano S.C..

During the 1938–39 American Soccer League, the club started to use the name Ludlow Lusitano to play the ASL's New England Division, making it to the final of the National Amateur Cup in 1952. For the 1956/57 season, the team returned to be known as Ludlow S.C.. After the division folded in 1953, the club took part in different regional leagues before finally joining the ASL.

The club played with this name the National Challenge Cup in 1984 and 1985. In total, the Gremio Lusitano played the National Challenge Cup four times.

=== Western Mass Pioneers ===
The club also founded the Western Mass Pioneers of the USL League Two, after not being able to use the name Gremio Lusitano because USISL had set a condition for new teams which prohibited ethnic team names.

=== Western Mass Lady Pioneers ===
Between 2004 and 2009, the club owned the Western Mass Lady Pioneers of the W-League.

== Year-by-year ==
Year	Division	League	Reg. season	Playoffs	U.S. Open Cup
1938/39	N/A	ASL	2nd	No playoff	?
1955/56	N/A	ASL	3rd	No playoff	?
1956/57	N/A	ASL	5th	No playoff	?
1957/58	N/A	ASL	9th	No playoff	?
