= Paterson Caledonian =

American soccer club

Paterson Caledonian was an American soccer club based in Paterson, New Jersey that was a member of the professional American Soccer League.

The club joined the ASL two months into the 1936/37 season, when they took over the Newark Germans and moved the team to Paterson.

Before the 1938/39 season, the club moved to Trenton, absorbed the amateur Trenton Highlanders club, and took their name.

== Year-by-year ==
Year	Division	League	Reg. season	Playoffs	U.S. Open Cup
1936/37	N/A	ASL	3rd, National	Semifinals	?
1937/38	N/A	ASL	5th, National	Did not qualify	?
