= Newark Portuguese =

American soccer club

The Newark Portuguese were an American soccer club based in Newark, New Jersey that was a member of the American Soccer League. The club had been around since 1922 and bought out the Kearny Celtic franchise after the 1950/51 season. The club won the Lewis Cup in 1953.

Newark's Ironbound, or Little Portugal, and the West Hudson towns along the Passaic River, Harrison and Kearny, have early and long tradition soccer.

== Year-by-year ==
Year	Division	League	Reg. season	Playoffs	U.S. Open Cup
1951/52	N/A	ASL	5th	No playoff	?
1952/53	N/A	ASL	2nd	No playoff	?
1953/54	N/A	ASL	2nd(t)	No playoff	?
1954/55	N/A	ASL	6th	No playoff	?
1955/56	N/A	ASL	4th	No playoff	?
1956/57	N/A	ASL	3rd	No playoff	?
1957/58	N/A	ASL	8th	No playoff	?
1958/59	N/A	ASL	8th	No playoff	?
1959/60	N/A	ASL	8th	No playoff	?
1960/61	N/A	ASL	7th	No playoff	?
1961/62	N/A	ASL	3rd	No playoff	Quarterfinals
1962/63	N/A	ASL	4th	No playoff	?
1963/64	N/A	?	?	?	?
1964/65	N/A	ASL	2nd	No playoff	?
1965/66	N/A	ASL	7th	No playoff	?
1966/67	2	ASL	4th, South	Did not qualify	?
1967/68	2	ASL	3rd, Premier	Did not qualify	?

== See also ==
- Sports in Newark, New Jersey
