= Kearny Scots =

American soccer team

Coordinates: 40.758°N 74.143°W

- Full name: Kearny Scots American Athletic Club
- Nickname: Scots
- Founded: 1895; 131 years ago
- Stadium: Harvey Field; Kearny, New Jersey
- Chairman: Andrew Pollock
- Head coach: Michael Vazquez
- League: United Premier Soccer League
Home colors

The Kearny Scots are an American soccer club based in Kearny, New Jersey. The club currently competes in the United Premier Soccer League, having previously played in the Garden State Soccer League and the American Premier Soccer League, a USASA-affiliated league and an amateur affiliate of the professional third tier NISA. The Scots are one of the oldest continuously operating soccer clubs in the United States.

In the Scots' earlier days, they played in both the National Association Football League and the second American Soccer League. When not members of those leagues, the Scots competed in lower level city leagues.

== History ==
The Scots had been established in the late 19th century and was a founding member of the first National Association Football League (NAFBL).

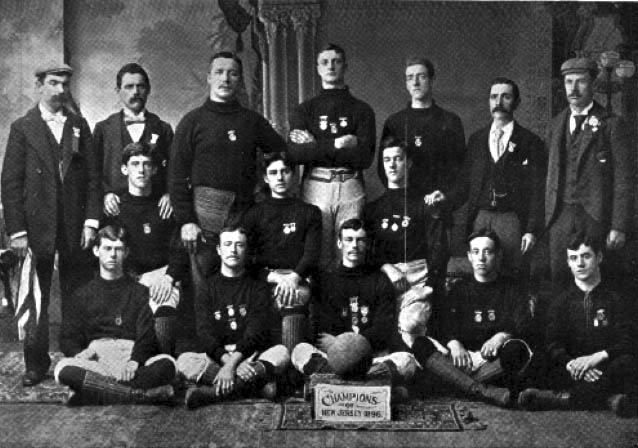
Team of Kearny in 1896. Legend says "Champions of New Jersey 1896"

In 1895, the Scots finished runner up to Bayonne Centerville in the NAFBL's first season. When the NAFBL folded at the end of the 1898–1899 season, the Scots continued to play in smaller local leagues. In 1909, the Scots became founding members of the second NAFBL and continued to play in the league until 1918.

They finished runner up in the 1906–1907, 1915–1916, and 1916–1917 seasons. The Scots began the 1918–1919 season, but the U.S. entry into World War I led to the loss of much of the team. Consequently, the Scots dropped out the NAFBL five games into the season.

After leaving the NAFBL in 1919, the Scots continued to play in city leagues. They returned to high level competition when they were an inaugural member of the second American Soccer League in 1933. Originally known as the "Scots-Americans", the club was officially renamed the "Kearny Americans" beginning with the 1941/42 season. The club continued to be better known as the Kearny Scots and returned to their original name before the 1950/51 season.

The club won the New Jersey State Challenge Cup in 1939 and in 1940 took a "double" winning the league and the Lewis Cup. The club won the Lewis Cup again in 1948.

Due to financial difficulties, the Scots withdrew from the American Soccer League after the 1952/53 season.

After playing in state leagues in New Jersey, the Scots re-joined the semi-professional circuit on June 30, 2021 by joining the Eastern Premier Soccer League.

The Scots joined the United Premier Soccer League in 2026 and debuted in the Division 1 Fall 2026 season, starting with a 2-0 win over Future Sports Academy.

== Year-by-year ==
Year	League	Division	Reg. season	Playoffs	American Cup	National Cup
Scottish Americans
1895	NAFBL	N/A	2nd	No playoff	Did not Enter	N/A
1895–96	NAFBL	N/A	No Record	No playoff	First Round	N/A
1896–97	NAFBL	N/A	3rd	No playoff	Second Round	N/A
1897–98	NAFBL	N/A	2nd	No playoff	Did not Enter	N/A
1898–99	NAFBL	N/A	5th	No playoff	N/A	N/A
1906	–				Semifinals	N/A
1906/07	NAFBL	N/A	3rd	No playoff	Final	N/A
1907/08	NAFBL	N/A	3rd	No playoff	First Round	N/A
1908/09	NAFBL	N/A	4th	No playoff	First Round	N/A
1909/10	NAFBL	N/A	4th	No playoff	Final	N/A
1910/11	NAFBL	N/A	8th	No playoff	Third Round	N/A
1911/12	NAFBL	N/A	8th	No playoff	Preliminary Round	N/A
1912/13	NAFBL	N/A	5th	No playoff	Second Round	N/A
1913/14	NAFBL	N/A	3rd	No playoff	Second Round	Did not Enter
1914/15	NAFBL	N/A	3rd	No playoff	Champions	Quarterfinals
1915/16	NAFBL	N/A	2nd	No playoff	Finals	?
1916/17	NAFBL	N/A	2nd	No playoff	Second Round	Third round
1917/18	NAFBL	N/A	4th	No playoff	Second Round	Second round
1918/19	–				Second Round	Third round
1933–34	ASL II	Metropolitan	3rd	No playoff	N/A	Third round
1934–35	ASL II	Metropolitan	8th	No playoff	N/A	Quarterfinals
1935–36	ASL II	Metropolitan	3rd	No playoff	N/A	Quarterfinals
1936–37	ASL II	Metropolitan	2nd	Champion	N/A	Quarterfinals
1937–38	ASL II	Metropolitan	1st	Champion	N/A	First round
1938–39	ASL II	Metropolitan	1st	Champion	N/A	Second round
1939–40	ASL II	Metropolitan	1st	Champion (no playoff)	N/A	Third round
1940–41	ASL II	Metropolitan	1st	Champion (no playoff)	N/A	?
Kearny Americans	ASL II	Metropolitan				
1941–42	ASL II	Metropolitan	6th	No playoff	N/A	Quarterfinals
1942–43	ASL II	Metropolitan	8th	No playoff	N/A	Round of 16
1943–44	ASL II	Metropolitan	8th	No playoff	N/A	Round of 16
1944–45	ASL II	N/A	6th	No playoff	N/A	Round of 32
1945–46	ASL II	N/A	6th	No playoff	N/A	Round of 16
1946–47	ASL II	N/A	5th	No playoff	N/A	?
1947–48	ASL II	N/A	2nd	No playoff	N/A	Second round
1948–49	ASL II	N/A	5th	Did not qualify	N/A	?
1949–50	ASL II	N/A	5th	No playoff	N/A	?
Kearny Scots	ASL II	N/A				
1950–51	ASL II	N/A	2nd	No playoff	N/A	?
1951–52	ASL II	Metropolitan	2nd	No playoff	N/A	?
1952–53	ASL II	Metropolitan	7th	No playoff	N/A	?
2011–12	NJSL	Premier World	8th	Did not qualify	N/A	Did not enter
2012–13	NJSL	Premier World	9th	Did not qualify	N/A	Did not enter
2013–14	NJSL	Premier World	12th	Did not qualify	N/A	Did not enter
2014–15	NJSL	Premier World	12th	Did not qualify	N/A	Did not enter
2020–21	GSSL	A North	8th	Did not qualify	N/A	Did not enter
2021-22	GSSL				N/A	Did not enter
2022-23	EPSL	Metropolitan Conference	9th	Did not qualify	N/A	1st Qualifying Round
2023-24	GSSL				N/A	Did not enter
2024-25	GSSL				N/A	Did not enter
2025-26	UPSL	Division 1			N/A	2nd Qualifying Round

== Honors ==
American Cup

- Winner (1): 1915
- Runner-up (3): 1907, 1910, 1916

American Soccer League

- Winner (5): 1936–37, 1937–38, 1938–39, 1939–40, 1940–41
- Runner-up (2): 1947–48, 1951–52

Lewis Cup

- Winner (2): 1940, 1948

New Jersey Men's Open State Cup

- Winner (6): 1924–25, 1932–33, 1938–39, 1939–40, 1964–65, 1990–91

== See also ==
- George Conn - played 12 seasons for Kearny Scots
