= American Soccer League (1933–1983) =

Defucnt soccer league in the United States (1933–1983)

- Founded: 1933; 93 years ago
- Folded: 1983; 43 years ago
- Country: United States
- Promotion to: None
- Relegation to: None

The American Soccer League was a soccer league in the United States which was founded in 1933 and folded in 1983.

The name has been a name used by four different professional soccer sports leagues in the United States.

The second American Soccer League was established in the summer of 1933 following the collapse of the first league with the same name, which lasted from 1921 until spring 1933. The new league was created on a smaller scale and with smaller budgets. This league existed until over-expansion and financial limitations led to its collapse in 1983. Two successor leagues later operated.

== History ==
In the fall of 1933, the second American Soccer League was established, surviving until 1983. Like the original ASL, this league operated primarily in the Northeastern United States for much of its existence. The league grew to become inter-regional in 1972 by adding several teams from the Midwest; the Chicago Americans, Cincinnati Comets, Cleveland Stars, Detroit Mustangs, and St. Louis Frogs. In order to compete with the growing North American Soccer League, the ASL went national in 1976, expanding to the Western United States by adding teams in Los Angeles, Oakland, Sacramento, Salt Lake City, and Tacoma. In addition, Bob Cousy was hired as commissioner and the league changed the standings scoring system to more closely resemble the NASL. ASL teams were awarded 5 points for a win, 2 points for a tie, and 1 point for each goal up to a maximum of 3 per game. The NASL awarded 6 points for a win and 3 for a tie, with 1 for each goal up to 3 per game. The ASL also had a limit on the number of foreign players each team could have in an effort to gain popularity among American fans.

The logo of the league until 1978.

While this expansion gave the ASL national exposure, the league and teams were no match financially for the NASL. On rare occasions, an ASL team would outbid a NASL team for a recognizable player, but more often than not, the better players in the ASL were offered more money to jump to the NASL. The high point in the history of the league may have been the 1976 championship game between the Los Angeles Skyhawks and New York Apollo; Skyhawks won 2–1 in front of over 9,000 fans. But by 1979, attendance was down, every team was losing money, and the league finally folded in 1983. After the ASL II ceased operations, several of its teams formed the original United Soccer League, which played seasons in 1984 and 1985.

=== Champions ===
==== 1933/34 through 1943/44 ====
Year	Metropolitan Division	New England Division	Top scorers	MVPs
1933–34	Irish-Americans (1)	Fairlawn Rovers (1)	Archie Stark & Razzo Carroll (Metro) ??? (NE)	Not awarded
1934–35	Philadelphia German-American (1)	Portuguese Sport Club (1)	Millard Lang (Metro) ??? (NE)	Not awarded
1935–36	New York Americans (1)	league dormant	Alex Rae (Metro)	Not awarded
1936–37	Scots-Americans (1)	Providence S.C. (1)	Charlie Ernst (Metro) ??? (NE)	Not awarded
1937–38	Scots-Americans (2)	Providence S.C. (2)	Fabri Salcedo (Metro) ??? (NE)	Not awarded
1938–39	Scots-Americans (3)	Lusitania Recreation (1)	Bert Patenaude (Metro) ??? (NE)	Not awarded
1939–40	Scots-Americans (4)	Swedish-Americans (1)	Charlie Ernst (Metro) ??? (NE)	Not awarded
1940–41	Scots-Americans (5)	Fall River S.C. (1)	Fabri Salcedo (Metro) ??? (NE)	Not awarded
1941–42	Philadelphia Americans (2)	St. Michael's (unofficial) (Note: St. Michael's won a first half playoff game over the Scandinavians. That game was ordered to be replayed during the league's second half. The replay never occurred and the league's second half ended after only one more game was played.)	John Nanoski (Metro) ??? (NE)	Not awarded
1942–43	Brooklyn Hispano (1)	league dormant	Chappie Sheppell (Metro)	Not awarded
1943–44	Philadelphia Americans (3)	league dormant	Tommy Marshall (Metro)	Not awarded

==== 1944/45 through 1983 ====
Year	Winner (number of titles)	Runners-up	Top scorer	MVP
1944–45	Brookhattan (1)	Philadelphia Americans	John Nanoski	Steve Rozbora
1945–46	Baltimore Americans (1)	Brooklyn Hispano	Fabri Salcedo	Ray McFaul
1946–47	Philadelphia Americans (4)	Brooklyn Wanderers	Bill Fisher	Servile Mervine
1947–48	Philadelphia Americans (5)	Kearny Scots	Nicholas Kropfelder	John O'Connell
1948–49	Philadelphia Nationals (1)	New York Americans	Pito Villanon	John O'Connell
1949–50	Philadelphia Nationals (2)	Kearny Celtic	Joe Gaetjens	Joe Maca
1950–51	Philadelphia Nationals (3)	Kearny Celtic	Nicholas Kropfelder	John Donald
1951–52	Philadelphia Americans (6)	Kearny Scots	Dick Roberts	Benny McLaughlin
1952–53	Philadelphia Nationals (4)	Newark Portuguese	Pito Villanon	Pito Villanon
1953–54	New York Americans (2)	Brookhattan	Jack Calder	Cyril Hannaby
1954–55	Uhrik Truckers (7)	Brooklyn Hispano	John Ferris	John Ferris
1955–56	Uhrik Truckers (8)	Elizabeth Falcons	Gene Grabowski	Jack Hynes
1956–57	New York Hakoah-Americans (1)	Uhrik Truckers	George Brown	John Oliver
1957–58	New York Hakoah-Americans (2)	Ukrainian Nationals	Lloyd Monsen	Walter Kudenko
1958–59	New York Hakoah-Americans (3)	Ukrainian Nationals	Pasquale Pepe (17)	Yuriy Kulishenko
1959–60	Colombo (1)	Ukrainian Nationals	Mike Noha (16)	Andy Racz
1960–61	Ukrainian Nationals (1)	Falcons S.C.	Herman Niss (17)	Mike Noha
1961–62	Ukrainian Nationals (2)	Inter-Brooklyn Italians	Peter Millar (18)	Peter Millar
1962–63	Ukrainian Nationals (3)	Inter S.C.	Ismael Ferreyra (14)	Peter Millar
1963–64	Ukrainian Nationals (4)	Boston Metros	Walter Chyzowych (15)	Abbie Wolanow
1964–65	Hartford S.C (1)	Newark Portuguese	Herculiano Riguerdo (7)	Alberto Falak
1965–66	Roma S.C. (1)	Newark Ukrainian Sitch	Walter Chyzowych (27)	Walter Chyzowych
1966–67	Baltimore St. Gerards (1)	Newark Ukrainian Sitch	Jorge Benitez (16)	Myron Worobec
1967–68	Ukrainian Nationals (5)	New York Inter	Ivan Paleto (14)	Robert Waugh
1968	Washington Darts (1)	Rochester Lancers	Gerry Browne (12)	
1969	Washington Darts (2)	Syracuse Scorpions	Jim Lefkos (22)	Robert Waugh
1970	Philadelphia Ukrainians (6)	Philadelphia Spartans	Juan Paletta (6); Willie Mfum	Albert Trik
1971	New York Greeks (1)	Boston Astros	Charles Duccilli (11)	Bob Hatzos
1972	Cincinnati Comets (1)	New York Greeks	Charles Duccilli (5); Nelson Brizuela; Joseph Oqnajac; George Pulita; John Kostakis	Ringo Cantillo
1973	New York Apollo (2)	Cincinnati Comets	Eddy Roberts (12)	Helio Barbosa
1974	Rhode Island Oceaneers (1)	New York Apollo	Mohammad Attiah (11)	Ringo Cantillo
1975	New York Apollo (3), Boston Astros (1)	co-champions	José Neto (23)	José Neto
1976	Los Angeles Skyhawks (1)	New York Apollo	Jim Hinch (13); José Neto	Jim Hinch
1977	New Jersey Americans (1)	Sacramento Spirits	José Neto (17)	Ringo Cantillo
1978	New York Apollo (4)	Los Angeles Skyhawks	Jim Rolland (17); Mike Mancini; José Neto	Jim Rolland
1979	Sacramento Gold (1)	Columbus Magic	Poli Garcia (15); Joey Fink	Poli Garcia
1980	Pennsylvania Stoners (1)	Sacramento Gold	Mal Roche (17)	George Gorleku
1981	Carolina Lightnin' (1)	New York United	Billy Boljevic (25)	Billy Boljevic
1982	Detroit Express (1)	Oklahoma City Slickers	Andy Chapman (23)	Brian Tinnion
1983	Jacksonville Tea Men (1)	Pennsylvania Stoners	Jeff Bourne (17)	Peter Simonini

=== Team list ===
- Allentown (1938/39-39/40, as Bethlehem Hungarian in 1938/39; folded during 1939/40 season)
- Baltimore S.C. (1934/35-1941/42; 1943/44-47/48, as Canton S.C. in 1934/35-35/36)
- Baltimore Americans (1938/39-48/49, as Baltimore German in 1938/39; franchise purchased by league after 3 games of 1948/49 season)
- Baltimore Pompei (1953/54-60/61, as Baltimore Rockets in 1953/54-56/57)
- Baltimore Flyers (1966/67-67/68; as Baltimore St. Gerards in 1966/67)
- Baltimore Bays (1972–73, as Baltimore Stars in 1972)
- Boca Juniors (1961/62-63/64, as Inter-Brooklyn Italians in 1961/62; as Inter S.C. in 1962/63)
- Boston Tigers (1963/64, 1965/66-67/68, as Boston Metros in 1963/64)
- Brooklyn F.C. (1933/34; merged with Hispano F.C. after 12 games to become Brooklyn Hispano)
- Brooklyn Celtic (1933/34-34/35)
- Brooklyn Hispano (1933/34-55/56, as Hispano F.C. for first 7 games of 1933/34 season, merged with Brooklyn F.C. to become Brooklyn Hispano, as Brooklyn Giants in 1941/42, as Brooklyn Red Devils in 1941/42-42/43)
- Brooklyn Wanderers (1942/43-48/49, franchise purchased by Hakoah A.C. 2 games into 1948/49 season; former St. Mary's Celtic franchise)
- Brooklyn Hakoah (1948/49-55/56, purchased Brooklyn Wanderers franchise two games into 1948/49 season; merged with New York Americans to become New York Hakoah after 1955/56 season)
- Brooklyn Italians (1956/57-60/61, merged with Inter S.C. to become Inter-Brooklyn Italians after 1960/61 season)
- California Sunshine (1977–80) – based in Orange, California and Oxnard, California.
- Carolina Lightnin' (1981–83)
- Chicago Americans (1972, only played a few games)
- Chicago Cats (1975–76)
- Cincinnati Comets (1972–75)
- Cleveland Cobras (1974–1981, as Cleveland Stars in 1972–73)
- Colombo (1959/60)
- Columbus Magic (1979–80)
- Connecticut Yankees (1972–78, as Nor'East United in 1972, as Connecticut Wildcats in 1973–74)
- Dallas Americans (1983)
- Delaware Wings (1972–74)
- Detroit Mustangs (1972–73, as Detroit S.C. earlier in 1972)
- Detroit Express (1981–83)
- Fall River S.C. (1957/58-62/63)
- Galicia-Honduras (1933/34-61/62, as New York Brookhattan in 1933/34-37/38; as Brookhattan in 1938/39-56/57; as Brookhattan-Galicia in 1957/58-58/59; as Galicia S.C. in 1958/59-60/61, merged with non-league Honduras after 1960/61 season)
- Georgia Generals (1982, as Cleveland Stars in 1972–73; as Cleveland Cobras in 1974–81)
- Golden Gate Gales (1980) – based in San Francisco.
- Hartford S.C. (1964/65-68, as Hartford Kings in 1966/67 & 1968)
- Indiana Tigers (1973–74, as Gary Tigers in 1973)
- Indianapolis Daredevils (1974–79, as Rhode Island Oceaneers in 1974–76; as New England Oceaneers in 1977)
- Inter S.C. (1960/61, merged with Brooklyn Italians to become Inter-Brooklyn Italians after 1960/61 season)
- Irish-Americans (1933/34-51/52, as Kearny Celtic in 1942/43-48/49, franchise purchased by Newark Portuguese 7 games into 1951/52 season)
- Jacksonville Tea Men (1983)
- Las Vegas Seagulls (1979)
- Los Angeles Skyhawks (1976–79)
- Ludlow Lusitano (1955/56-57/58, as Ludlow S.C. in 1956/57)
- Miami Americans (1976–80, as New Jersey Americans in 1976–79)
- Nashville Diamonds (1982)
- Newark Portuguese (1951/52-62/63, 1964/65-67/68, purchased Irish-Americans franchise seven games into 1951/52 season)
- Newark Falcons (1954/55-66/67, as Elizabeth Falcons in 1954/55-58/59; as Falcons S.C. in 1959/60-61/62; as Falcons-Warsaw in 1962/63-63/64)
- Newark Sitch (1962/63-63/64, 1965/66-70, as Newark Ukrainian Sitch in 1962/63-68)
- New Brunswick Hungarian (1963/64-67/68, as New Brunswick Hungarian Americans in 1963/64-66/67)
- New England Sharks (1981)
- New Jersey Brewers (1972–75, as New Jersey Shaefer Brewers in 1972)
- New York Americans (1933/34-55/56, merged with Brooklyn Hakoah to become New York Hakoah after 1955/56 season)
- New York Hakoah-Americans (1956/57-63/64, as New York Hakoah in 1956/57-61/62)
- New York Inter (1965/66-69, as Inter S.C. in 1965/66)
- New York United (1971–81, as New York Greeks in 1971–72; as New York Apollo in 1973–79)
- New York Eagles (1978–79, 1981)
- Oakland Buccaneers (later known at Golden Bay Buccaneers (1976–77)
- Oklahoma City Slickers (1982–83)
- Olimpia (1965/66-66/67)
- Paterson F.C. (1936/37-40/41, as Newark Germans in 1933/34-36/37; moved to Paterson during 1936/37 season; as Paterson Caledonian 1936/37-37/38, absorbed amateur Trenton Highlanders after 1937/38 season and moved to Trenton; as Trenton Highanders in 1938/39)
- Pennsylvania Stoners (1979–83)
- Philadelphia Nationals (1936/37-41/42, as Passon Phillies in 1936/37-40/41)
- Philadelphia Nationals (1942/43-53/54, withdrew after 4 games in 1953/54)
- Philadelphia Ukrainians (1957/58)
- Philadelphia Ukrainians (1957/58-63/64, 1965/66-70, as Ukrainian Nationals in 1957/58-63/64 & 1965/66-67/68; replaced Philadelphia Ukrainians during 1957/58 season)
- Philadelphia Spartans (1969–73)
- Phoenix Fire (1980)
- Pittsburgh Canons (1972)
- Pittsburgh Miners (1975)
- Ponta Delgada S.C. (1951–53)
- Rochester Lancers (1967/68-69)
- Rochester Flash (1981–82)
- Roma S.C. (1964/65-67/68)
- Sacramento Gold (1976–80, as Sacramento Spirits in 1976–77)
- St. Louis Frogs (1972)
- St. Mary's Celtic (1933/36-41/42; franchise purchased before 1942/43 season and became Brooklyn Wanderers)
- Santa Barbara Condors (1977)
- Scots-Americans (1933/34-52/53, as Kearny Americans in 1941/42-49/50, aka Kearny Scots)
- Southern California Lazers (1978) – based in Torrance, California.
- Syracuse Suns (1969–71, 1973–74, as Syracuse Scorpions in 1969–70; folded after 5 games during 1974 season)
- Tacoma Tides (1976)
- Trenton Americans (1948/49-50/51, 1953/54-54/55)
- Trenton Athletics (1948-51)
- Uhrik Truckers (1933/34-64/65, as Philadelphia German-Americans in 1933/34-40/41; as Philadelphia Americans in 1941/42-53/54; became Uhrik Truckers in February 1953/54 season)
- Utah Golden Spikers (1976, expelled from league during 1976 season)
- Utah Pioneers (1976, replaced Golden Spikers, played out 1976 season)
- Washington Darts (1967/68-69, as Washington Britannia in 1967/68)
- Washington Cavaliers (1971–72, as Virginia Capitol Cavaliers in 1971)
- Worcester Astros (1967/68-75, as Fall River Astros from 1967/68-68; as Boston Astros in 1968–75; moved to Worcester at end of 1975 season)
