= Baltimore Americans =

American soccer club based in Baltimore, Maryland, US

The Baltimore German was an American soccer club based in Baltimore, Maryland that was a member of the American Soccer League. After their first season, the club was renamed the Baltimore Americans. (Note: Another Baltimore team playing in the league at the same time, Baltimore S.C., did not become a new Baltimore Americans club. Baltimore S.C. withdrew from the league for the 1942/43 season and returned for the next season. The Baltimore Americans continued with the league.) The Americans won the Lewis Cup in 1947. The league purchased the franchise three games into the 1948/49.

== Year-by-year ==
| Year | Division | League | Reg. season | Playoffs | National Cup |
|---|---|---|---|---|---|
| 1938/39 | N/A | ASL | 6th, National | Did not qualify | ? |
| 1939/40 | N/A | ASL | 11th | No playoff | ? |
| 1940/41 | N/A | ASL | 9th | No playoff | ? |
| 1941/42 | N/A | ASL | 10th | No playoff | ? |
| 1942/43 | N/A | ASL | 5th | No playoff | ? |
| 1943/44 | N/A | ASL | 3rd | No playoff | ? |
| 1944/45 | N/A | ASL | 4th | No playoff | ? |
| 1945/46 | N/A | ASL | 1st | Champion (no playoff) | ? |
| 1946/47 | N/A | ASL | 4th | No playoff | ? |
| 1947/48 | N/A | ASL | 4th | No playoff | ? |
| 1948/49 | N/A | ASL | Withdrew after 3 games | N/A | N/A |
