= Brooklyn Celtic =

US association football club

Brooklyn Celtic was a name used by at least two U.S. soccer teams. The first was an early twentieth century amateur team which was formed in August 1910 and dominated the New York Amateur Association Football League from 1912 to 1917. The second was a member of the professional American Football League in the 1930s and early 1940s. A third Celtic club from Brooklyn, St. Mary's Celtic replaced the second club in the ASL before the 1935/36 season.

== Brooklyn Celtic I ==
Brooklyn Celtic
- Full name: Brooklyn Celtic Football Club
- Nickname: "The Celtics"
- Founded: 1910
- Dissolved: 1920; 106 years ago
Home colors

The Brooklyn Celtic, also known as the Brooklyn Celtics and Celtic F.C., was an early twentieth century American soccer team which competed in the New York Amateur Association Football League. They won the second division in 1910–11, gaining promotion to the first division. They proved their worth as a first division team in the 1911–12 season when they tied New York Clan MacDonald for second place. The two teams met in a playoff for sole position of second, with Clan MacDonald winning 1–0. The next season, Celtic went on a streak of five straight league championships. Celtic was the runner-up in the first National Challenge Cup in 1914. The following year, Celtic was the runner-up for both the American Cup and the Challenge Cup.

=== Year-by-year ===
Year	League	Reg. season	American Cup	National Cup
1910–11	NYSAFL (Div 2)	1st	Second Round	N/A
1911–12	NYSAFL	3rd	First Round	N/A
1912–13	NYSAFL	1st	DNE	N/A
1913–14	NYSAFL	1st	Second Round	Runner-up
1914–15	NYSAFL	1st	Runner-up	Runner-up
1915–16	NYSAFL	1st	Quarterfinals	Third round
1916–17	NYSAFL	1st	Semifinals	Second round

== Honors ==
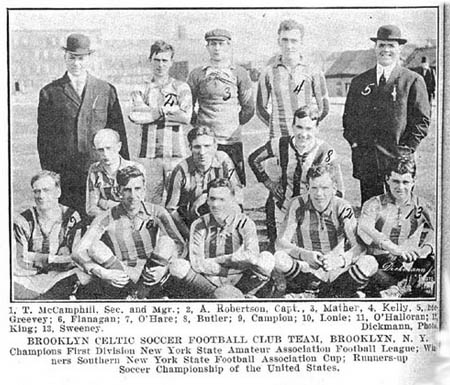
The 1913–14 team

- National Challenge Cup
  - Runner-up (2): 1914, 1915
- American Cup
  - Runner-up (1): 1915
- American Amateur Football Association Cup
  - Winner (1): 1912
- League Championship – Division I
  - Winner (5): 1913, 1914, 1915, 1916, 1917
- League Championship – Division II
  - Winner (1): 1910
- Sultana Cup
  - Winner (1): 1917
- Southern New York State Cup
  - Winner (2): 1914, 1917

=== Notable players ===
- (United States) James Robertson
- Roddy O'Halloran
- (United States) George Tintle

== Brooklyn Celtic II ==
The Brooklyn Celtic was an American soccer club based in Brooklyn, New York that was an inaugural member of the reformed American Soccer League. The club was newly organized in the fall of 1933 and joined the ASL soon after.

The club was dropped from the league after the 1934/35 season and replaced by St. Mary's Soccer Club.

=== Year-by-year ===
Year	Division	League	Reg. season	Playoffs	National Cup
1933–34	N/A	ASL	5th	No playoff	First round
1934–35	N/A	ASL	7th	No playoff	Second round

== St. Mary's Celtic ==
St. Mary's Celtic
- Full name: St. Mary's Celtic Football Club
- Nickname: The Gaels
- Founded: ?
- Dissolved: 1943; 83 years ago
- Stadium: Celtic Park
Home colors

St. Mary's Celtic was an American soccer club based in Brooklyn, New York that was a member of the reformed American Soccer League. The club replaced Brooklyn Celtic before the 1935–36 season.

St. Mary's won their first (and only) National Cup in 1939 after beating Manhattan Beer 5–1 on aggregate over two legs. The second leg was held in Starlight Park with an attendance of 8,000.

=== Year-by-year ===
Year	Division	League	Reg. season	Playoffs	National Cup
1935–36	N/A	ASL	6th	No playoff	Semi-finals
1936–37	N/A	ASL	1st, National	Semi-finals	Second round
1937–38	N/A	ASL	2nd, National	Final	Second place
1938–39	N/A	ASL	2nd, National	1st round	Champion
1939–40	N/A	ASL	8th	No playoff	?
1940–41	N/A	ASL	8th	No playoff	?
1941–42	N/A	ASL	7th	No playoff	?

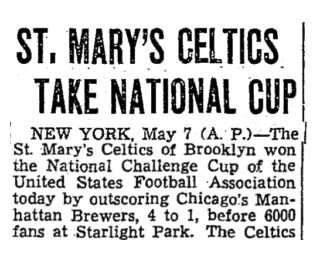
Chronicle of the National Cup won by St. Mary's, 7 May 1939
