= Baltimore S.C. =

Soccer club based in Baltimore, Maryland, US

Baltimore S.C. is the name of two soccer clubs based in Baltimore, Maryland. One is a premier youth club formed in 2002 and the other was a member of the American Soccer League (ASL).

The original team began in 1917 under the name of the True American Club. They were the first uniformed boys' team in the state and won the junior state title in the 1920–21 season. A year later they changed their affiliation to Canton S.C. Before the 1936/37 season, the club became known as Baltimore S.C. After the 1941/42 season, the club was granted a one-year exemption from American League play. The club rejoined the league before the 1943/44 season. After the 1947/48 season, the franchise was purchased and moved to Trenton, New Jersey to become the Trenton Americans.

The current club has premier youth teams for children aging 9–18.

Results of the former Baltimore SC:

== Year-by-year ==
Year	Division	League	Reg. season	Playoffs	National Cup
1934/35	N/A	ASL	6th	No playoff	?
1935/36	N/A	ASL	2nd	No playoff	?
1936/37	N/A	ASL	2nd, American	1st Round	?
1937/38	N/A	ASL	4th, American	did not qualify	?
1938/39	N/A	ASL	5th, American	did not qualify	?
1939/40	N/A	ASL	2nd(t)	No playoff	Champions (Note: Title shared.)
1940/41	N/A	ASL	3rd	No playoff	?
1941/42	N/A	ASL	5th	No playoff	?
1942/43	on hiatus				
1943/44	N/A	ASL	10th	No playoff	?
1944/45	N/A	ASL	10th	No playoff	?
1945/46	N/A	ASL	10th	No playoff	?
1946/47	N/A	ASL	10th	No playoff	?
1947/48	N/A	ASL	8th	No playoff	?
