= Kearny Celtic =

Irish
- Full name: Kearny Irish American Football Club
- Nicknames: The Bhoys, The Hoops
- Founded: 1933; 85 years ago
- Ground: Harvey Field; Kearny, NJ
- Manager: Anthony Portelli
- Coach: Santiago Formoso
- League: North Jersey Soccer League
Home colours	Third colours

The Kearny Irish was an American soccer club based in Kearny, New Jersey; it was an inaugural member of the reformed American Soccer League. Commonly known as the Irish-Americans, the club was renamed the Kearny Celtic prior to the 1942/43 season. The team returned to their original name before the 1949/50 season. In 1944, the club won the Lewis Cup.

Due to mounting financial losses, the franchise was bought by the Newark Portuguese S.C. in early December 1951. Newark joined the ASL and carried on from the Irish-Americans' record of two wins, two losses and three ties.

== Year-by-year ==
Year	Division	League	Reg. season	Playoffs	U.S. Open Cup
1933/34	N/A	ASL	1st	Champion (no playoff)	?
1934/35	N/A	ASL	9th	No playoff	?
1935/36	N/A	ASL	8th	No playoff	?
1936/37	N/A	ASL	4th, American	Did not qualify	?
1937/38	N/A	ASL	3rd, American	Semifinals	?
1938/39	N/A	ASL	3rd, American	1st Round	?
1939/40	N/A	ASL	5th	No playoff	?
1940/41	N/A	ASL	10th	No playoff	?
1941/42	N/A	ASL	8th	No playoff	?
1942/43	N/A	ASL	7th	No playoff	?
1943/44	N/A	ASL	6th	No playoff	?
1944/45	N/A	ASL	7th	No playoff	?
1945/46	N/A	ASL	3rd	No playoff	?
1946/47	N/A	ASL	7th	No playoff	?
1947/48	N/A	ASL	9th	No playoff	?
1948/49	N/A	ASL	7th	Did not qualify	?
1949/50	N/A	ASL	2nd	No playoff	?
1950/51	N/A	ASL	3rd?	No playoff	?
1951/52	N/A	ASL	Played seven games	N/A	N/A
