= Brookhattan =

American soccer team

- Full name: Brookhattan
- Founded: 1933
- Dissolved: 1962

Brookhattan was an American soccer club based in New York City that was a member of the professional American Soccer League (ASL) from 1933 to 1962. The name is a blend of the names of Manhattan and Brooklyn where it played. It later changed its name to Brookhattan–Galicia (1948, though informally often Brookhattan thereafter), Galicia (1958), and Galicia–Honduras (1961) after Galicia in Spain and Honduras.

Formed as New York Brookhattan in 1933, it joined the first ASL and was leading the spring 1933 half-season when the league collapsed. It then joined the new ASL as Brookhattan in late 1933. In 1942 it won the Lewis Cup, and in 1945 the ASL, National Challenge Cup and Lewis Cup.

In 1947, coffee importer Eugene Diaz, owner of New York Galicia, bought the Brookhattan team, withdrew Galicia from the National Soccer League of New York and transferred its players to Brookhattan. The merged team, renamed Brookhattan–Galicia, reached the final of the 1948 National Challenge Cup.

During the 1948–49 season, Brookhattan's Pito Villanon led the ASL in scoring. In the 1949–50 season, Joe Gaetjens was the top scorer in the ASL. Pito Villanon led the ASL in scoring in 1952–53 and was also the ASL MVP. Brookhattan finished runner-up in the ASL in 1954.

In 1961 Galicia merged with Honduras, a non-ASL team, to form Galicia–Honduras.

== Sources ==
- Brucato, Thomas W. (2001). Major Leagues. Scarecrow Press. ISBN 9780810839083.
