= Philadelphia Nationals =

American association football club

Philadelphia Nationals was the name of two American soccer clubs based in Philadelphia, Pennsylvania that were both members of the professional American Soccer League.

== Passon F.C./Passon Phillies/Philadelphia Nationals ==
Originally, and amateur club called Passon F.C., the club became better known as the Passon Phillies or Philadelphia Passon. The team joined the professional American Soccer League prior to the 1936/37 season. Prior to the 1941/42 season, the club became the Philadelphia Nationals.

The club withdrew from the league prior to the 1942/43 season and was replaced an amateur Philadelphia club, Fairhill F.C., that was admitted to the league and took the name Philadelphia Nationals.

=== Year-by-year ===
Year	Division	League	Reg. season	Playoffs	National Cup
1936/37	N/A	ASL	4th, National	1st Round	Quarterfinal
1937/38	N/A	ASL	4th, National	Did not qualify	First round
1938/39	N/A	ASL	3rd, National	Semifinals	?
1939/40	N/A	ASL	9th	No playoff	?
1940/41	N/A	ASL	7th	No playoff	?
1941/42	N/A	ASL	9th	No playoff	?

== Fairhill F.C./Philadelphia Nationals ==
Originally, and amateur club called Fairhill F.C., the team joined the professional American Soccer League prior to the 1942/43 season to replace the Philadelphia Nationals which withdrew from the league in the off-season. Fairhill F.C. was admitted to the league and took the name Philadelphia Nationals.

The club earned a "mini-double" in both 1949 and 1951 winning the league championship and the league cup (the Lewis Cup). The club won the Lewis Cup again in 1952. The Fairhill Club withdrew their sponsorship of the team prior to the 1953/54 season and, due to subsequent financial difficulties, the club folded after four games.

=== Year-by-year ===
Year	Division	League	Reg. season	Playoffs	National Cup
1942/43	N/A	ASL	9th	No playoff	?
1943/44	N/A	ASL	5th	No playoff	?
1944/45	N/A	ASL	5th	No playoff	?
1945/46	N/A	ASL	9th	No playoff	?
1946/47	N/A	ASL	8th	No playoff	?
1947/48	N/A	ASL	5th	No playoff	?
1948/49	N/A	ASL	1st(t)	Champion	Final
1949/50	N/A	ASL	1st	Champion (no playoff)	?
1950/51	N/A	ASL	1st	Champion (no playoff)	?
1951/52	N/A	ASL	2nd	No playoff	Final
1952/53	N/A	ASL	1st	Champion (no playoff)	Semifinals
1953/54	N/A	ASL	9th	folded after 4 games	N/A
