= Brooklyn Hispano =

Soccer club based in New York, US

The Brooklyn Hispano was a soccer club based in Brooklyn, New York, United States, that was an inaugural member of the reformed American Soccer League. The club was named the Brooklyn Giants for the 1942/43 season only.

The Hispano club competed in the Southern New York State Football Association with several successful runs in their Cup competition during the 1920s. The club won the competition in 1927 and 1930 as the New York Hispano. N.Y. Hispano was a member of the professional Eastern Soccer League - a rival of the A.S.L. during the "soccer war" of 1929–1930.

After 7 games of the 1933/34 ASL season the team merged with Brooklyn F.C. The aggregation was renamed Brooklyn Hispano Football Club which began play on January 21, 1934 and assumed the record of Hispano F.C. in the standings.

The club took the "double" in 1943 winning the league and National Challenge Cup. The team won the Lewis Cup in 1946.

== Year-by-year ==
Year	Division	League	Reg. season	Playoffs	National Cup
1933/34	N/A	ASL	7th	No playoff	Semifinals
1934/35	N/A	ASL	4th	No playoff	First round
1935/36	N/A	ASL	9th	No playoff	First round
1936/37	N/A	ASL	1st, American	Final	Semifinals
1937/38	N/A	ASL	5th, American	did not qualify	First round
1938/39	N/A	ASL	4th, American	did not qualify	Second round
1939/40	N/A	ASL	7th	No playoff	?
1940/41	N/A	ASL	5th	No playoff	?
1941/42	N/A	ASL	4th	No playoff	?
1942/43	N/A	ASL	1st	Champion (no playoff)	Champion
1943/44	N/A	ASL	4th	No playoff	Champion
1944/45	N/A	ASL	8th	No playoff	?
1945/46	N/A	ASL	2nd	No playoff	?
1946/47	N/A	ASL	3rd(t)	No playoff	?
1947/48	N/A	ASL	10th	No playoff	?
1948/49	N/A	ASL	1st(t)	1st Round	Quarterfinal
1949/50	N/A	ASL	8th	No playoff	?
1950/51	N/A	ASL	9th	No playoff	?
1951/52	N/A	ASL	8th	No playoff	?
1952/53	N/A	ASL	4th	No playoff	?
1953/54	N/A	ASL	4th	No playoff	?
1954/55	N/A	ASL	2nd	No playoff	?
1955/56	N/A	ASL	8th	No playoff	?
