= Uhrik Truckers =

- Full name: Uhrik Truckers Soccer Club
- Nickname: Truckers
- Founded: 1933
- Dissolved: 1966; 60 years ago
- Ground: Lighthouse Field; Northeast High School Field
- Owner: Anthony M. Uhrik
- League: ASL
Home colors

Philadelphia German-American was an American soccer club based in Philadelphia, Pennsylvania that was an inaugural member of the professional American Soccer League.

Before the 1941–42 season the club became known as the Philadelphia Americans. During the 1953–54 season, the franchise was bought by trucking magnate Anthony M. Uhrik, owner of the "A.M. Uhrik, Inc." and renamed the Uhrik Truckers. Many of the team players worked in the Uhrik truck company serving as drivers or at the loading docks.

Home games were played at Lighthouse Field and Northeast High School Field.

The team earned a "mini-double" in 1955 winning the league championship and league cup (the Lewis Cup). The club also won the National Amateur Cup in 1933 and 1934 and the Lewis Cup in 1941, 1943 and 1958.

== Year-by-year ==
Season	Div.	League			National cup
Season	Div.	Assoc.	Reg. season	Playoffs	National cup
1933–34	N/A	ASL	8th	– (Note: No playoffs held, championship decided on points during regular season.)	did not participate
1934–35	N/A	ASL	1st	Champion	did not participate
1935–36	N/A	ASL	4th	–	Champion
1936–37	N/A	ASL	3rd	did not qualify	did not participate
1937–38	N/A	ASL	1st	Semifinals	did not participate
1938–39	N/A	ASL	2nd, American	Final	Semifinals
1939–40	N/A	ASL	6th	–	Quarterfinals
1940–41	N/A	ASL	2nd	–	did not participate
1941–42	N/A	ASL	1st	Champion	Semifinals
1942–43	N/A	ASL	3rd	–	Semifinals
1943–44	N/A	ASL	1st	Champion	Round of 16
1944–45	N/A	ASL	2nd	–	Quarterfinals
1945–46	N/A	ASL	8th	–	Semifinals
1946–47	N/A	ASL	1st	Champion	Quarterfinals
1947–48	N/A	ASL	1st	Champion	Quarterfinals
1948–49	N/A	ASL	6th	did not qualify	did not participate
1949–50	N/A	ASL	6th	–	did not participate
1950–51	N/A	ASL	6th	–	did not participate
1951–52	N/A	ASL	1st	Champion	did not participate
1952–53	N/A	ASL	3rd	–	did not participate
1953–54	N/A	ASL	8th	–	Quarterfinals
1954–55	N/A	ASL	1st	Champion	Semifinals
1955–56	N/A	ASL	1st	Champion	Quarterfinals
1956–57	N/A	ASL	2nd	–	did not participate
1957–58	N/A	ASL	7th	–	?
1958–59	N/A	ASL	3rd	–	?
1959–60	N/A	ASL	10th	–	?
1960–61	N/A	ASL	10th	–	?
1961–62	N/A	ASL	9th	–	?
1962–63	N/A	ASL	8th	–	did not participate
1963–64	N/A	ASL	7th	–	did not participate
1964–65	N/A	ASL	5th	–	did not participate

== Coaches ==
- Jimmy Mills 1956-
