= New York Americans (soccer) =

Former soccer club in New York, New York

The New York Americans were an American soccer club founded in 1931. Based in New York, New York, it played in both the first American Soccer League and second American Soccer League.

== History ==
In 1931, Erno Schwarz, who had played for both the New York Giants and Hakoah All-Stars in the ASL, founded his own team, the New York Americans. That fall, he entered it into the American Soccer League which was in the process of collapsing caused by financial losses stemming from the 1928–1929 "Soccer Wars" and the onset of the Great Depression. Schwarz owned, played for and managed the Americans through the last two years of the ASL's existence. After the disintegration of the original ASL following the 1933 spring season, the ownership of the Americans and New York Brookhattan helped form a new, but lower professional level, ASL in 1933/34. A notable player for the team was Sol Eisner.

Just before the 1956/57 season, the club merged with Brooklyn Hakoah to form New York Hakoah.

The club won the Lewis Cup and the Duffy Cup in 1950. The club also earned a "double" in 1954 winning both the ASL championship and the National Challenge Cup.

In 1965, a team named New York Americans entered the International Soccer League (ISL) and reached the final losing the championship to Polonia Bytom.

== Year-by-year ==
| Year | Division | League | Reg. season | Playoffs | National Cup |
|---|---|---|---|---|---|
| 1931 | 1 | ASL | 6th (Fall) | No playoff | N/A |
| Spring 1932 | 1 | ASL | 5th? | No playoff | 1st Round |
| Fall 1932 | 1 | ASL | 3rd | No playoff | N/A |
| Spring 1933 | 1 | ASL | ? | ? | Final |
| 1933/34 | N/A | ASL | 2nd | No playoff | ? |
| 1934/35 | N/A | ASL | 2nd | No playoff | ? |
| 1935/36 | N/A | ASL | 1st | Champion (no playoff) | ? |
| 1936/37 | N/A | ASL | 5th, National | did not qualify | Champion |
| 1937/38 | N/A | ASL | 3rd(t), National | 1st Round | ? |
| 1938/39 | N/A | ASL | 4th, National | did not qualify | ? |
| 1939/40 | N/A | ASL | 4th | No playoff | ? |
| 1940/41 | N/A | ASL | 6th | No playoff | ? |
| 1941/42 | N/A | ASL | 3rd | No playoff | ? |
| 1942/43 | N/A | ASL | 6th | No playoff | ? |
| 1943/44 | N/A | ASL | 9th | No playoff | ? |
| 1944/45 | N/A | ASL | 9th | No playoff | ? |
| 1945/46 | N/A | ASL | 5th | No playoff | ? |
| 1946/47 | N/A | ASL | 6th | No playoff | ? |
| 1947/48 | N/A | ASL | 6th | No playoff | ? |
| 1948/49 | N/A | ASL | 1st(t) | Finals | ? |
| 1949/50 | N/A | ASL | 3rd | No playoff | ? |
| 1950/51 | N/A | ASL | 5th | No playoff | ? |
| 1951/52 | N/A | ASL | 6th | No playoff | ? |
| 1952/53 | N/A | ASL | 6th | No playoff | Semifinals |
| 1953/54 | N/A | ASL | 1st | Champion (no playoff) | Champion |
| 1954/55 | N/A | ASL | 8th | No playoff | ? |
| 1955/56 | N/A | ASL | 6th | No playoff | ? |
