= List of members of the National Soccer Hall of Fame =

The National Soccer Hall of Fame is a private, non-profit institution established in 1979 that honors soccer achievements in the United States. Induction into the hall is widely considered the highest honor in American soccer.

== Key ==
Position	The first position listed is the position at which the individual is best known.
Italics	Players who were elected in their first year of eligibility.

== Members ==
=== Players ===
Year	Name	Primary position	Primary club	Years Active	Induction method	Vote %	Ref
1950	Archie Stark	Forward	Bethlehem Steel	1912–1934	Players	unknown	
1950	Billy Gonsalves	Forward	Fall River F.C.		Players	unknown	
1950	Dick Spalding	Defender	Fleisher Yarn		Players	unknown	
1950	Harry Ratican	Forward	Ratican's		Players	unknown	
1950	Jock Ferguson	Defender	Bethlehem Steel		Players	unknown	
1950	Millard Lang	Forward	Chicago Sparta		Players	unknown	
1950	Peter Wilson	Defender			Players	unknown	
1950	Robert Millar	Forward	Indiana Flooring		Players	unknown	
1950	Sheldon Govier	Midfielder			Players	unknown	
1951	Davey Brown	Forward	New York Giants		Players	unknown	
1951	Harold Brittan	Forward	Fall River F.C.		Players	unknown	
1951	Johnny McGuire	Forward	New Bedford Whalers		Players	unknown	
1951	Peter Renzulli	Goalkeeper	New York Nationals		Players	unknown	
1951	Robert Morrison	Midfielder			Players	unknown	
1951	Thomas Swords	Forward			Players	unknown	
1951	William Fryer	Midfielder	Fall River F.C.		Players	unknown	
1952	George Tintle	Goalkeeper	Harrison S.C.		Players	unknown	
1953	Johnny Jaap	Forward	Bethlehem Steel		Players	unknown	
1954	Aldo Donelli	Forward			Players	unknown	
1954	Jimmy Douglas	Goalkeeper	Newark Skeeters, New York Giants		Players	unknown	
1955	Tommy Duggan	Forward			Players	unknown	
1958	Francis Ryan	Midfielder			Players	unknown	
1959	Ralph Caraffi	Midfielder	Fall River United		Players	unknown	
1963	Rudolph Kuntner	Forward	Bridgeport Hungaria		Players	unknown	
1965	Fred Beardsworth	Midfielder			Players	unknown	
1965	Teddy Glover	Defender	New York Giants		Players	unknown	
1966	Stanley Chesney	Goalkeeper	New York Americans		Players	unknown	
1968	Arnie Oliver	Forward	J&P Coats		Players	unknown	
1971	Bert Patenaude	Forward	Fall River F.C.		Players	unknown	
1971	Gene Olaff	Goalkeeper			Players	unknown	
1973	Joseph Gryzik	Midfielder			Players	unknown	
1974	Jimmy Dunn	Forward	Ben Millers		Players	unknown	
1974	Nicholas DiOrio	Forward			Players	unknown	
1974	Werner Mieth	Midfielder			Players	unknown	
1975	Alex Weir	Defender			Players	unknown	
1976	Adam Wolanin	Forward	Pogoń Lwów		Players	unknown	
1976	Charlie Colombo	Defender	St. Louis Simpkins-Ford		Players	unknown	
1976	Ed Souza	Forward	Ponta Delgada S.C.		Players	unknown	
1976	Frank Borghi	Goalkeeper	St. Louis Simpkins-Ford		Players	unknown	
1976	Frank Wallace	Forward	St. Louis Simpkins-Ford		Players	unknown	
1976	Geoff Coombes	Midfielder			Players	unknown	
1976	Gino Gardassanich	Goalkeeper			Players	unknown	
1976	Harry Keough	Defender			Players	unknown	
1976	James Gentle	Forward			Players	unknown	
1976	Joe Gaetjens	Forward	Brookhattan		Players	unknown	
1976	Joe Maca	Defender			Players	unknown	
1976	John Souza	Forward			Players	unknown	
1976	Robert Annis	Defender	St. Louis Simpkins-Ford		Players	unknown	
1976	Walter Bahr	Defender			Players	unknown	
1976	Gino Pariani	Forward			Players	unknown	
1977	Jack Hynes	Forward			Players	unknown	
1978	Al Zerhusen	Midfielder			Players	unknown	
1978	Raymond Bernabei	Defender			Players	unknown	
1979	Al Harker	Defender			Players	unknown	
1980	John Boulos	Forward			Players	unknown	
1982	Joe Carenza, Sr.	Midfielder			Players	unknown	
1983	George Barr	Defender			Players	unknown	
1986	Alexander Wood	Defender			Players	unknown	
1986	Andy Auld	Midfielder			Players	unknown	
1986	Bart McGhee	Forward			Players	unknown	
1986	Ed McIlvenny	Midfielder/Defender			Players	unknown	
1986	Frank Vaughn	Defender			Players	unknown	
1986	George Moorhouse	Defender			Players	unknown	
1986	Jim Brown	Forward			Players	unknown	
1986	Jimmy Gallagher	Midfielder			Players	unknown	
1986	Mike Bookie	Midfielder			Players	unknown	
1986	Philip Slone	Midfielder			Players	unknown	
1986	Raphael Tracey	Midfielder			Players	unknown	
1986	Thomas Florie	Forward			Players	unknown	
1989	Bob Gormley	Forward			Players	unknown	
1989	Walter Dick	Forward			Players	unknown	
1989	Werner Roth	Defender			Players	unknown	
1989	Willy Roy	Forward			Players	unknown	
1990	Shamus O'Brien	Forward			Players	unknown	
1991	Rudy Getzinger	Midfielder			Players	unknown	
1992	Efrain Chacurian	Forward			Players	unknown	
1992	Werner Fricker	Midfielder			Players	unknown	
1993	Pelé	Forward			Players	unknown	
1993	John Nanoski	Forward			Players	unknown	
1994	Lloyd Monsen	Forward			Players	unknown	
1994	Pat McBride	Midfielder			Players	unknown	
1995	George Brown	Forward			Players	unknown	
1995	Willy Schaller	Defender			Players	unknown	
1996	Len Oliver	Midfielder			Players	unknown	
1996	Nicholas Kropfelder	Forward			Players	unknown	
1996	Paul Danilo	Forward			Players	unknown	
1997	Robert Craddock	Forward			Players	unknown	
1997	Alex Ely	Midfielder			Players	unknown	
1997	Benny McLaughlin	Forward			Players	unknown	
1997	Jimmy Roe	Forward			Players	unknown	
1997	Johnny Moore	Midfielder			Players	unknown	
1998	April Heinrichs	Forward			Players	unknown	
1998	Ed Murphy	Forward			Players	unknown	
1998	Franz Beckenbauer	Defender			Players	unknown	
2000	Carin Jennings-Gabarra	Forward			Players	unknown	
2000	Giorgio Chinaglia	Forward			Players	unknown	
2001	Rick Davis	Midfielder			Players	unknown	
2001	William Looby	Forward			Players	unknown	
2002	Adolph Bachmeier	Midfielder/Defender			Players	unknown	
2002	Shannon Higgins	Midfielder			Players	unknown	
2002	Vladislav Bogićević	Midfielder			Players	unknown	
2003	Alan Willey	Forward			Players	unknown	
2003	Arnie Mausser	Goalkeeper			Players	unknown	
2003	Bob Lenarduzzi	Defender			Players	unknown	
2003	Bruce Wilson	Defender			Players	unknown	
2003	Carlos Alberto	Defender			Players	unknown	
2003	Karl-Heinz Granitza	Forward			Players	unknown	
2003	Patrick Ntsoelengoe	Midfielder/Forward			Players	unknown	
2003	Paul Child	Forward			Players	unknown	
2004	Eric Wynalda	Forward			Players	93.2%	
2004	Michelle Akers	Midfielder			Players	95.9%	
2004	Mike Windischmann	Defender			Veterans	unknown	
2004	Paul Caligiuri	Midfielder			Players	89.0%	
2005	Alex McNab	Forward			Veterans	unknown	
2005	Fabri Salcedo	Forward			Veterans	unknown	
2005	Fernando Clavijo	Defender			Veterans	unknown	
2005	John Harkes	Midfielder			Players	87.0%	
2005	John Nelson	Forward			Veterans	unknown	
2005	Marcelo Balboa	Defender			Players	87.8%	
2005	Tab Ramos	Midfielder			Players	87.8%	
2005	Tommy Fleming	Forward			Veterans	unknown	
2005	Werner Nilsen	Midfielder/Forward			Veterans	unknown	
2006	Al Trost	Midfielder			Veterans	unknown	
2006	Alexi Lalas	Defender			Players	84.1%	
2006	Carla Overbeck	Defender			Players	75.2%	
2007	Bobby Smith	Defender			Veterans	unknown	
2007	Julie Foudy	Defender			Players	83.7%	
2007	Mia Hamm	Forward			Players	97.2%	
2008	Hugo Perez	Midfielder			Veterans	unknown	
2009	Jeff Agoos	Defender			Players	67.9%	
2009	Joy Fawcett	Defender			Players	66.7%	
2010	Preki	Forward			Players	68.38%	
2010	Kyle Rote, Jr.	Forward			Veterans	60.42%	
2010	Thomas Dooley	Defender			Players	70.94%	
2011	Bruce Murray	Forward/Midfielder			Veterans	58.14%	
2011	Cobi Jones	Midfielder			Players	87.13%	
2011	Earnie Stewart	Midfielder			Players	71.29%	
2011	Eddie Pope	Defender			Players	74.26%	
2012	Claudio Reyna	Midfielder			Players	96.1%	
2012	Desmond Armstrong	Defender/Midfielder			Veterans	unknown	
2012	Tony Meola	Goalkeeper			Players	90.2%	
2013	Joe-Max Moore	Forward			Players	unknown	
2013	Peter Vermes	Defender			Veterans	unknown	
2014	Brian McBride	Forward			Players	95%	
2014	Kristine Lilly	Defender			Players	91.67%	
2015	Glenn Myernick	Defender			Veterans	63.4%	
2015	Kasey Keller	Goalkeeper			Players	95.8%	
2016	Brandi Chastain	Defender			Players	unknown	
2016	Shannon MacMillan	Midfielder			Veterans	unknown	
2017	Briana Scurry	Goalkeeper			Players	69.0%	
2018	Brad Friedel	Goalkeeper			Players	88.1%	
2018	Tiffeny Milbrett	Forward			Players	75.2%	
2018	Cindy Parlow Cone	Midfielder			Veterans	59.5%	
2019	Abby Wambach	Forward			Players	80.9%	
2020	Carlos Bocanegra	Defender			Players	68.5%	
2021	Steve Cherundolo	Defender			Players	Unknown	
2021	Christie Pearce	Defender			Players	Unknown	
2021	Jaime Moreno	Forward			Players	Unknown	
2022	Clint Dempsey	Forward			Players	97.9%	
2022	Shannon Boxx	Midfielder			Players	91.7%	
2022	Hope Solo	Goalkeeper			Players	80.9%	
2022	Linda Hamilton	Defender			Veteran	79.2%	
2022	Marco Etcheverry	Midfielder			Veteran	80.9%	
2023	DaMarcus Beasley	Defender/Midfielder			Players	93.3%	
2023	Landon Donovan	Forward/Midfielder			Players	95.8%	
2023	Lauren Holiday	Midfielder			Players	83.3%	
2023	Kate Markgraf	Defender			Veteran	75.0%	
2023	Steve Zungul	Forward			Veteran	79.2%	
2024	Tisha Venturini-Hoch	Midfielder			Veteran	70.8%	
2024	Tim Howard	Goalkeeper			Players	95.8%	
2024	Josh McKinney	Midfielder/Forward			Players	72.9%	
2025	Carli Lloyd	Midfielder			Players	97.9%	
2025	Nick Rimando	Goalkeeper			Players	72.9%	
2025	Mary Harvey	Goalkeeper			Veterans	95.8%	
2025	Chris Armas	Midfielder			Veterans	79.2%	
2026	Tobin Heath	Forward			Players	93.8%	
2026	Heather O'Reilly	Forward			Players	97.9%	
2026	Chris Wondolowski	Forward			Players	77.1%	
2026	Kevin Crow	Defender			Veterans	79.2%	
2026	Tony Sanneh	Defender			Veterans	87.5%	

=== Builders ===
Year	Name	Primary club	Induction method	Vote %	Ref
1950	Andrew M. Brown		Builders	unknown	
1950	Douglas T. Stewart		Builders	unknown	
1950	G. Randolph Manning		Builders	unknown	
1950	George Kempton		Builders	unknown	
1950	Horace Edgar Lewis		Builders		
1950	John Brock		Builders		
1950	Thomas W. Cahill		Builders		
1951	Alfred A. Smith		Builders		
1951	Alfredda Iglehart		Builders		
1951	Dent McSkimming		Builders		
1951	Edward J. Donaghy		Builders		
1951	Elmer Schroeder		Builders		
1951	Ernő Schwarz		Builders		
1951	George M. Collins		Builders		
1951	George Healey		Builders		
1951	Harry Fairfield		Builders		
1951	James McGuire		Builders		
1951	John A. Fernley		Builders		
1951	Peter Peel		Builders		
1951	Rudy Epperlein		Builders		
1951	William Jeffrey		Builders		
1952	Jack Johnson		Builders		
1952	James Armstrong		Builders		
1952	Joseph Booth		Builders		
1952	Joseph Triner		Builders		
1952	William Palmer		Builders		
1953	David Gould		Builders		
1953	John J. MacEwan		Builders		
1953	John W. Wood		Builders		
1953	John Marre		Builders		
1953	Joseph J. Barriskill		Builders		
1953	Paul Klein		Builders		
1953	Powys A.L. Foulds		Builders		
1953	Wilfred R. Cummings		Builders		
1954	Jimmy Mills		Builders		
1955	Edgar Pomeroy		Builders		
1956	Victor Weston		Builders		
1956	William Anderson		Builders		
1957	Arnold Ramsden		Builders		
1957	Vernon R. Reese		Builders		
1958	Charles Ferro		Builders		
1958	Fred Netto		Builders		
1958	John Young		Builders		
1958	Daniel Zampini		Builders		
1959	Robert B. Craddock		Builders		
1960	Emil Schillinger		Builders		
1961	Matthew Boxer		Builders		
1961	Milton Miller		Builders		
1961	Peter Merovich		Builders		
1961	William Hemmings		Builders		
1962	Walter Giesler		Builders		
1963	Dimitrious Niotis		Builders		
1963	Harry Kraus		Builders		
1964	Jack Flamhaft		Builders		
1964	Oscar Kozma		Builders		
1964	Pete Garcia		Builders		
1966	Maurice Hudson		Builders		
1967	Colin Commander		Builders		
1967	Harry G. Fleming		Builders		
1967	Wally Peters		Builders		
1967	William Morrissette		Builders		
1968	Fred Shields		Builders		
1968	John W. Dresmich		Builders		
1968	Thomas Sager		Builders		
1969	August Steuer		Builders		
1969	Edmund Craggs		Builders		
1969	Samuel T.N. Foulds		Builders		
1970	Daniel W. Fowler		Builders		
1970	Jack Maher		Builders		
1971	Allan McClay		Builders		
1971	Jack J. Rottenberg		Builders		
1971	James A. Walder		Builders		
1971	James Moore		Builders		
1971	John Ardizzone		Builders		
1971	Nicolaas Steelink		Builders		
1971	Robert T. Stone		Builders		
1971	Umberto Abronzino		Builders		
1972	Duncan Duff		Builders		
1972	Julius A. Alonso		Builders		
1973	Joseph Delach		Builders		
1974	George E. Fishwick		Builders		
1975	Ted Cordery		Builders		
1977	Adolph Washauer		Builders		
1977	Enzo Magnozzi		Builders		
1978	Frank J. McGrath		Builders		
1978	Giorgio Piscopo		Builders		
1978	Lawrence E. Briggs		Builders		
1979	Enzo DeLuca		Builders		
1979	J.Eugene Ringsdorf		Builders		
1979	Kurt Lamm		Builders		
1979	Margaret Fowler		Builders		
1980	Bob Guelker		Builders		
1980	G.K. Guennel		Builders		
1981	Erwin Single		Builders		
1981	George Craggs		Builders		
1981	Harry Saunders		Builders		
1982	John O. Best		Builders		
1982	Lamar Hunt		Builders		
1983	Frank Kracher		Builders		
1984	Ernst Feibusch		Builders		
1984	Giuseppe Joseph Lombardo		Builders		
1984	Raymond G. Kraft		Builders		
1985	Donald Greer		Builders		
1985	Gene Edwards		Builders		
1986	John Coll		Builders		
1987	Don Phillipson		Builders		
1987	Mike Kabanica		Builders		
1987	Thomas Webb		Builders		
1988	Bertil Larson		Builders		
1988	Herbert Heilpern		Builders		
1989	Bob Kehoe		Builders		
1989	George Donnelly		Builders		
1989	Jerry Yeagley		Builders		
1990	Edward Pearson		Builders		
1990	Manfred Schellscheidt		Builders		
1991	Milton Aimi		Builders		
1992	Ron Newman		Builders		
1993	Dennis Long		Builders		
1994	Frank J. Kelly		Builders		
1995	Al Miller		Builders		
1995	Alfred Kleinaitis		Builders		
1995	Clay Berling		Builders		
1996	Gordon Bradley		Builders		
1996	Reinhold Spath		Builders		
1997	Phil Woosnam		Builders		
1997	Walter Chyzowych		Builders		
1998	Patrick Smith		Builders		
1998	Peter Collins		Builders		
2001	Bob Hermann		Builders		
2003	Ahmet Ertegun		Builders		
2003	Clive Toye		Builders		
2003	Elizabeth Robbie		Builders		
2003	Joe Robbie		Builders		
2003	Lee Stern		Builders		
2003	Nesuhi Ertegun		Builders		
2003	Steve Ross		Builders		
2003	Ted Howard		Builders		
2005	Hank Steinbrecher		Builders		
2006	Philip Anschutz		Builders		
2007	Alan Rothenberg		Builders		
2008	Anson Dorrance		Builders		
2010	Bruce Arena		Builders	77.78%	
2011	Bob Gansler		Builders	58.49%	
2012	Tony DiCicco		Builders		
2014	Bob Bradley		Builders	55.93%	
2015	Sigi Schmid		Builders	62.7%	
2016	Don Garber		Builders		
2017	Joe Machnik		Builders		
2018	Bob Contiguglia		Builders		
2019	Sunil Gulati		Builders		
2021	Kevin Payne		Builders		
2022	Esse Baharmast		Builders		
2023	Jill Ellis		Builders	83.3%	
2024	Francisco Marcos		Builders	70.8%	
2025	Mark Abbott		Builders	79.2%	
2026	Kari Seitz		Builders	79.2%	

== See also ==
- National Soccer Hall of Fame
