= National Soccer Hall of Fame =

Professional sports hall of fame in Frisco, Texas

Coordinates: 33°09′12.6″N 96°50′05.7″W

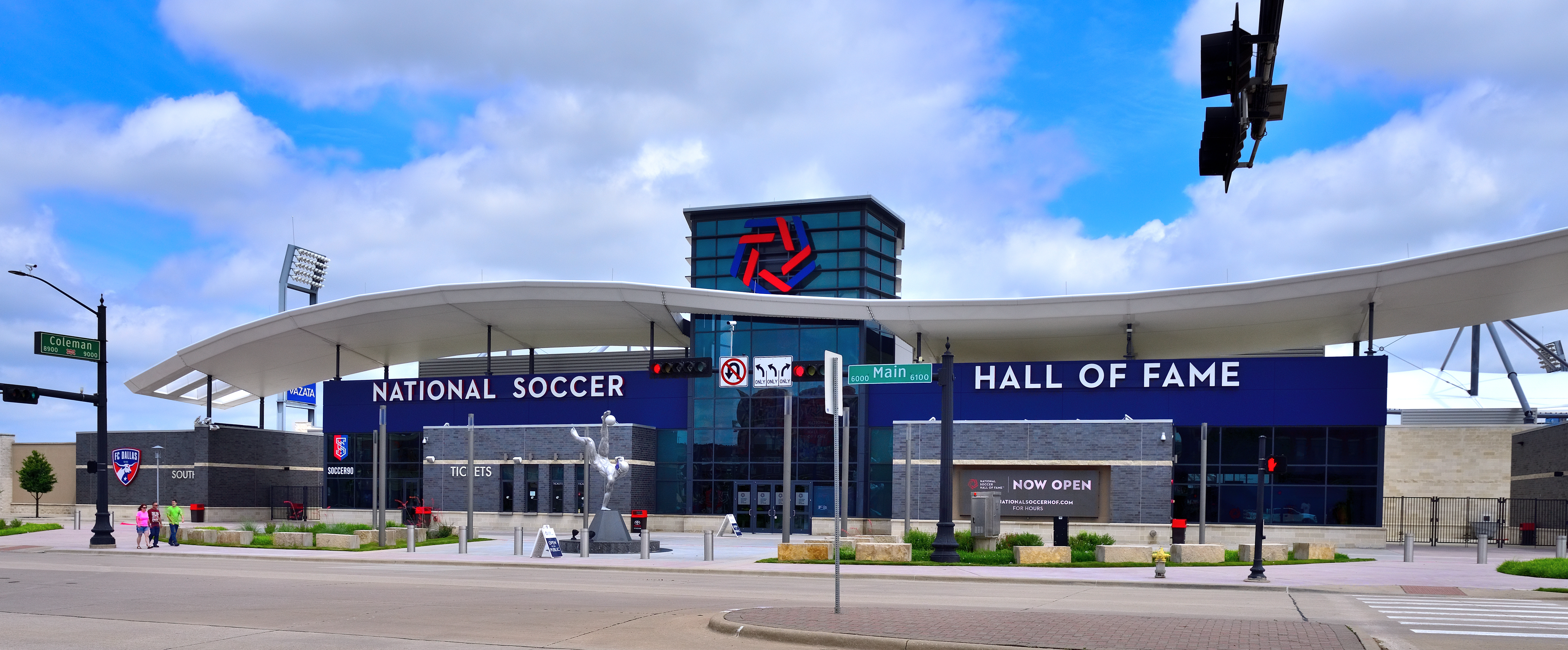
- Main entrance to the NSHF in 2021

- Location within Texas
- Established: 1950 (as institution in 1979)
- Location: Toyota Stadium; Frisco, Texas
- Type: Professional sports hall of fame
- Visitors: 17,000 per year
- Website: nationalsoccerhof.com

The National Soccer Hall of Fame is a public-private partnership among FC Dallas, the City of Frisco, Frisco Independent School District, and the U.S. Soccer Federation, and currently located in Toyota Stadium in Frisco, Texas, a suburb of Dallas. It honors soccer achievements in the United States. Induction is the highest honor in American soccer.

== History ==
The Hall of Fame was founded in 1950 by the Philadelphia "Old-timers" Association, a group of former professional and amateur soccer players that wanted to recognize the achievements of soccer in America.

=== Museum ===
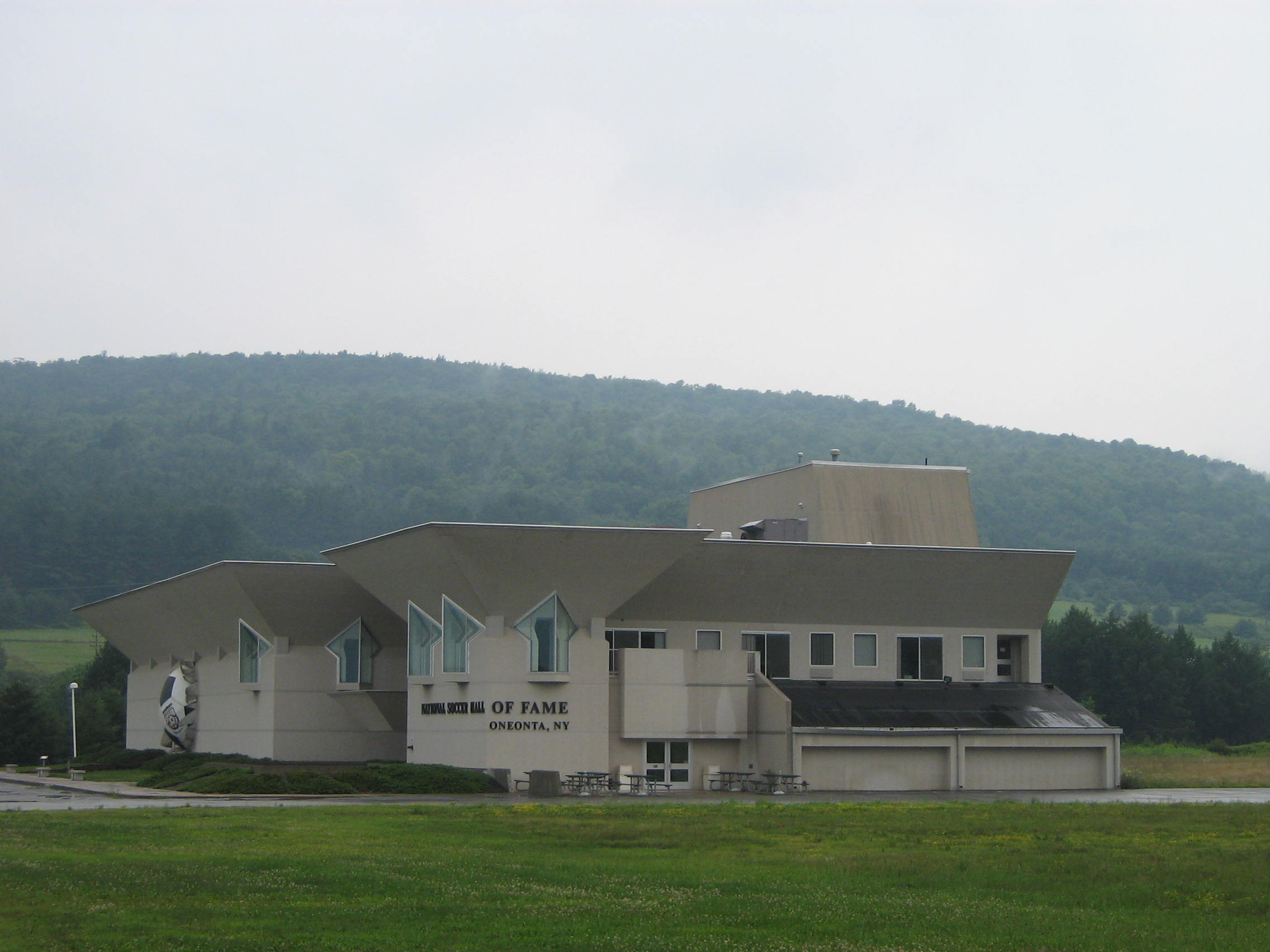
Former National Soccer Hall of Fame Museum in Oneonta, New York

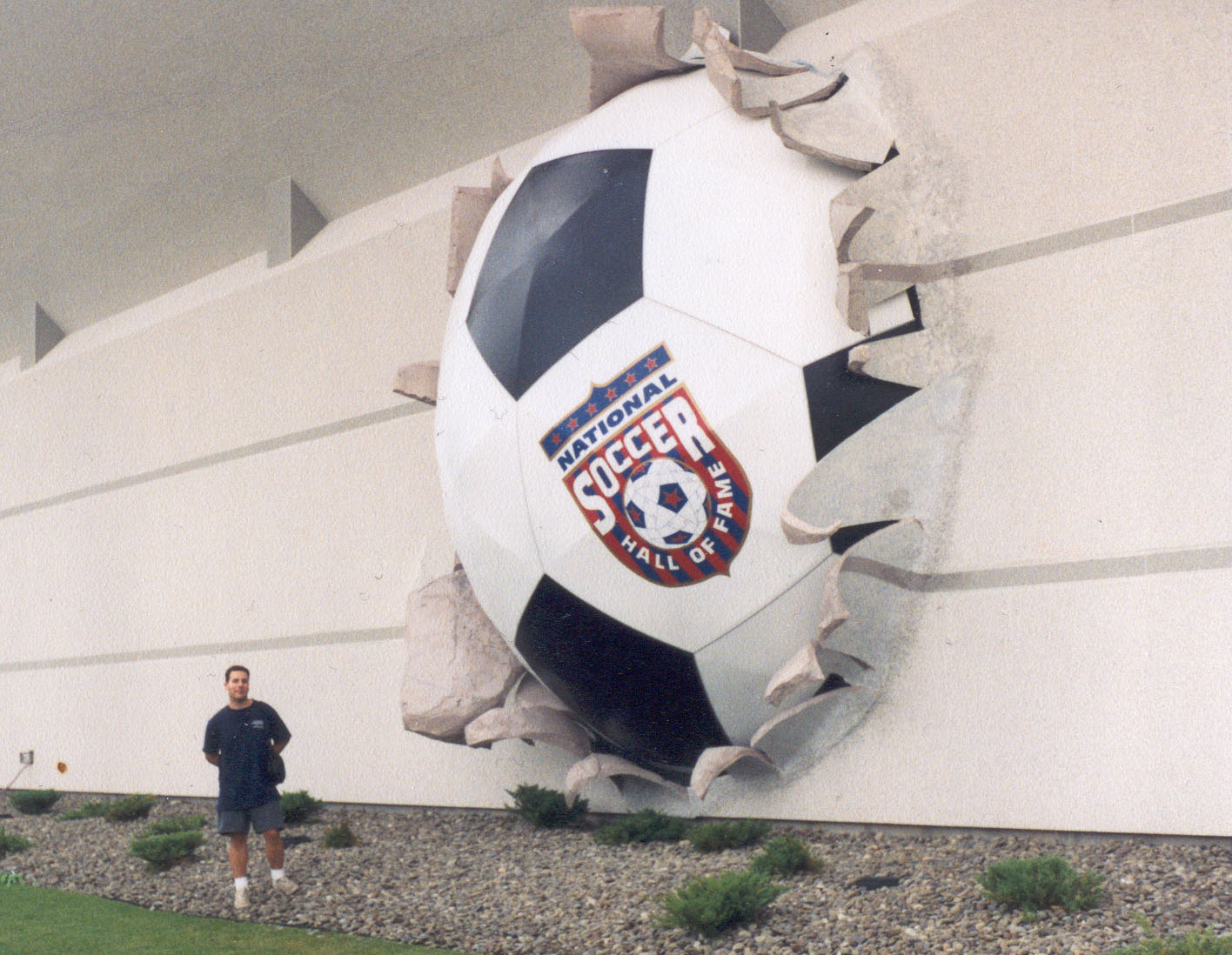
Giant ball going out of the former National Soccer Hall of Fame Museum

The Hall of Fame museum opened on June 12, 1999, in Oneonta, New York. The museum featured the hall of fame, a library, and an interactive soccer play area. The United States National Soccer Team Players Association partnered with the Hall of Fame to create the Time In program, which honored people with a connection to soccer battling leukemia. Since the disease disproportionately targets children, a majority of the honorees were youth soccer players.

Prior to the 2005 induction of the "Magnificent Five", individuals from the early and mid 20th century had been largely ignored. This change was brought about by the acquisition of a large volume of historical records relating to this period. These records combined with previously developed eligibility criteria led to the induction of Tommy Fleming, Alex McNab, Johnny Nelson, Werner Nilsen and Fabri Salcedo, five players whose notable careers all took place prior to 1950. The "Magnificent Five" were inducted posthumously into the Hall of Fame in August 2005.

Sports Illustrated reported on September 4, 2009 that the Hall would be closing to the public outside of certain match days. As a result of financial difficulties, the Hall cut six of its nine employees during that same month. The director of the Hall of Fame for almost ten years, Jack Huckel, left his position on December 18, 2009. On February 10, 2010, it was announced that the Hall would close its facility, though inductions will continue.

In September 2015, it was announced that a new Hall of Fame museum would be built at Toyota Stadium in Frisco, Texas, the home of Major League Soccer club FC Dallas. The new museum opened during the 2018 Enshrinement Ceremony on October 20, 2018. This new facility features additional memorabilia from soccer legends and high-tech, interactive exhibits.

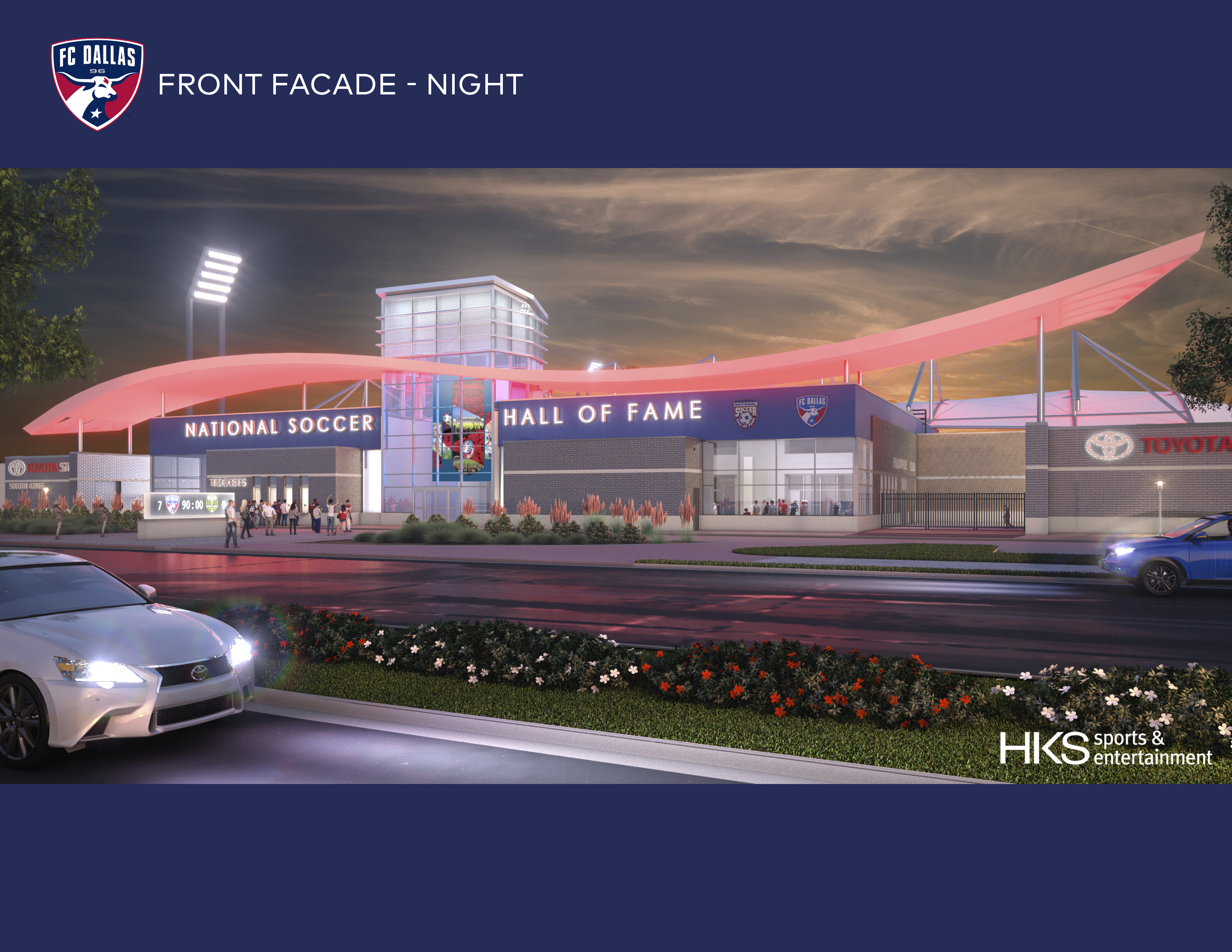
Rendering of building for the National Soccer Hall of Fame in Frisco, Texas. The opening was October 20, 2018. Image release by Hall of fame.

=== Archive ===
After the museum was closed, a collection of more than 80,000 items was distributed to various locations across the country, including the headquarters of Eurosport, a long-term corporate sponsor, in Hillsborough, North Carolina. The collection includes the following notable items:

- The oldest soccer ball made in the United States
- The 1991, 1999, 2015 and 2019 FIFA Women's World Cup Trophies
- The North American Soccer League archive
- The 1994 FIFA World Cup U.S. archive
- A rare soccer photography collection from New York depression-era photographer John Albok
- Materials from the U.S. national teams in World Cup competition
- Artifacts from the American Soccer League of the 1920s and 1950s
- Pelé’s New York Cosmos jersey
- The Lamar Hunt Open Cup trophy
- Mia Hamm’s cleats
- Commemorations of the first U.S. World Cup team in 1930

== Eligibility ==
Eligible individuals may be inducted into one of three categories: Player, Builder and Veteran (player). New individuals are inducted annually.

=== Players ===
To be eligible in the Player category, an individual must have met number 1, and either number 2 or number 3, of the following three criteria:

1. Retired as a player for at least three years, but for no more than 10 years.
2. Played at least 20 full international games for the United States. This requirement is reduced to 10 games if the games were prior to 1990.
3. Played at least five seasons in an American first-division professional league (currently MLS or NWSL), and won either the league championship, or the U.S. Open Cup, or was selected as a league all-star at least once.

=== Veterans ===
Players who have met either no. 2 or no. 3 but who retired more than 10 years ago are automatically placed on the Veteran eligibility list.

=== Builders ===
To be eligible in this category, an individual must have had a major, sustained and positive impact on soccer in the United States at a national or first division professional level in non-playing capacity. Due to the broad, general nature of the criteria, nominations for this category may be considered. Nominations are screened by the Hall of Fame Historian and Researcher who submit their recommendations to the Hall as to the appropriateness of the nominee's inclusion on the eligibility list.

== Medal of Honor ==
The National Soccer Hall of Fame's Medal of Honor is the highest honor given to people who have grown the sport of soccer in the United States. The Medal is awarded to individuals who has "demonstrated vision and played an historic role in changing the course of soccer in America." The Medal has been given out only four times in history.

Number	Awarded	Name	Achievements
1	1998	Alan Rothenberg	Director of the 1994 World Cup; President of U.S. Soccer (1990–98); Oversaw the establishment of MLS
2	1999	Lamar Hunt	Co-founder of the NASL (1967–84); Owner of 3 MLS teams during the early 2000s Built the second soccer-specific stadium in the country after Bethlehem Steel in 1913
3	2001	1991 Women's national team	Won the inaugural Women's World Cup
4	2006	Phil Anschutz	The most influential person in growing soccer in the U.S. Owned 6 of 10 MLS teams during the early 2000s Pushed MLS's development of soccer-specific stadiums

== Annual ballots ==
=== 2009 ballot ===
In 2009, the Hall of Fame inducted Jeff Agoos and Joy Fawcett in the Player category.

=== 2010 ballot ===
In 2010, Thomas Dooley and Preki Radosavljević were inducted in the Player category, Kyle Rote, Jr. in the Veteran category, and Bruce Arena in the Builder category.

=== 2011 ballot ===
On February 17, 2011, the Hall of Fame announced the candidates eligible for induction into the Hall for that year in all three categories. On March 29, 2011, the Hall of Fame announced that Cobi Jones, Eddie Pope, and Earnie Stewart would be inducted in the Player category. Bruce Murray was selected for the Veteran category, and Bob Gansler was selected in the Builder category.

=== 2012 ballot ===
On January 31, 2012, the United States Soccer Federation announced that the ballots were finalized for the Induction Class of 2012. Voting began on the day of the announcement and continued until February 17. Twelve Players were added to the ballot after qualifying for the first time. They included Tony Meola, Claudio Reyna, Jose Burciaga Jr., Ronald Cerritos, Lorrie Fair, Jennifer Lalor, Ronnie O'Brien, Ante Razov, David Regis, Thori Staples Bryan, Greg Vanney and Kerry Zavagnin. Of the remaining nine players in the pool, Mike Burns, Peter Nowak, Carlos Valderrama, and Peter Vermes were in their final year of eligibility.

On February 29, 2012, the USSF announced the induction of Tony Meola and Claudio Reyna in the Player category, Desmond Armstrong in the Veteran category, and Tony DiCicco in the Builder category. Reyna and Meola greatly exceeded the two-thirds threshold required to enter the Hall, receiving 96% and 90% of the vote respectively.

=== 2013 ballot ===
On October 11, 2013, the Hall of Fame inducted Joe-Max Moore as a Player and Peter Vermes as a Veteran.

=== 2014 ballot ===
On February 14, 2015, the Hall of Fame inducted the Class of 2014: Kristine Lilly (Player), Brian McBride (Player), and Bob Bradley (Builder).

=== 2015 ballot ===
On April 8, 2015, the USSF announced the Hall of Fame Class of 2015: Kasey Keller (Player), Glenn Myernick (Veteran), and Sigi Schmid (Builder).

=== 2016 ballot ===
On May 5, 2016, the USSF announced the Hall of Fame Class of 2016: Brandi Chastain (Player), Shannon MacMillan (Veteran), and Don Garber (Builder). Garber later deferred his enshrinement in the Hall to 2018.

=== 2017 ballot ===
On August 3, 2017, former United States women's national soccer team goalkeeper Briana Scurry and Joe Machnik were elected to the National Soccer Hall of Fame in the Player and Builder categories respectively.

=== 2018 ballot ===
On May 31, 2018, five new Inductees were announced: Cindy Parlow Cone (Veteran), Brad Friedel (Player), Tiffeny Milbrett (Player), Bob Contiguglia (Builder), and Don Garber (Builder, deferred from 2016). The 2018 class was the first class enshrined at the new facility in Frisco, Texas.

=== 2019 ballot ===
On September 21, 2019, the Hall of Fame inducted the Class of 2019: Abby Wambach (Player) and Sunil Gulati (Builder).

=== 2020 ballot ===
In 2020, Carlos Bocanegra (Player) was the only person elected into the Hall of Fame; his induction was delayed to 2021 due to the COVID-19 pandemic.

=== 2021 ballot ===
On October 2, 2021, the Hall of Fame inducted three members of the Class of 2021: Steve Cherundolo (Player), Jaime Moreno (Veteran), and Kevin Payne (Builder). Christie Pearce was also elected but deferred her induction to 2022. Carlos Bocanegra was also inducted as the lone member of the Class of 2020 after his induction was delayed by the COVID-19 pandemic.

=== 2022 ballot ===
On May 21, 2022, the Hall of Fame inducted five members of the Class of 2022: Shannon Boxx (Player), Clint Dempsey (Player), Marco Etcheverry (Veteran), Linda Hamilton (Veteran), and Esfandiar Baharmast (Builder). Hope Solo (Player) was also elected in 2022, but deferred her induction to 2023.

=== 2023 ballot ===
On May 6, 2023, the Hall of Fame inducted the six members of the Class of 2023: DaMarcus Beasley (Player), Landon Donovan (Player), Lauren Holiday (Player), Kate Markgraf (Player), Steve Zungul (Player), and Jill Ellis (Builder). Hope Solo was also inducted after being elected as part of the Class of 2022.

=== 2024 ballot ===
On May 4, 2024, the Hall of Fame inducted the four members of the Class of 2024: Tim Howard (Player), Josh McKinney (Player), Tisha Venturini (Player), and Francisco Marcos (Builder).

=== 2025 ballot ===
On May 3, 2025, the Hall of Fame inducted the five members of the Class of 2025: Carli Lloyd (Player), Nick Rimando (Player), Chris Armas (Veteran), Mary Harvey (Veteran), and Mark Abbott (Builder).

=== 2026 ballot ===
On May 1, 2026, the Hall of Fame inducted the five members of the Class of 2026: Tobin Heath (Player), Heather O'Reilly (Player), Chris Wondolowski (Player), Kevin Crow (Veteran), Tony Sanneh (Veteran), and Kari Seitz (Builder).

== Inductees ==
=== Players ===
- Jeff Agoos – 2009
- Michelle Akers – 2004
- Carlos Alberto – 2006
- Robert Annis – 1976
- Chris Armas – 2025
- Desmond Armstrong – 2012
- Andrew Auld – 1986
- Adolph Bachmeier – 2002
- Walter Bahr – 1976
- Marcelo Balboa – 2005
- George Barr – 1983
- Fred Beardsworth – 1965
- DaMarcus Beasley – 2023
- Franz Beckenbauer – 1998
- Raymond Bernabei – 1978
- Carlos Bocanegra – 2020
- Vladislav Bogićević – 2002
- Mike Bookie – 1986
- Frank Borghi – 1976
- John Boulos – 1980
- Shannon Boxx – 2022
- Harold Brittan – 1951
- Davey Brown – 1951
- George Brown – 1995
- Jim Brown – 1986
- Paul Caligiuri – 2004
- Ralph Caraffi – 1959
- Joe Carenza, Sr. – 1982
- Efrain Chacurian – 1992
- Brandi Chastain – 2016
- Stanley Chesney – 1966
- Steve Cherundolo – 2021
- Paul Child – 2003
- Giorgio Chinaglia – 2000
- Fernando Clavijo – 2005
- Charlie Colombo – 1976
- Geoff Coombes – 1976
- Robert W. Craddock – 1997
- Kevin Crow – 2026
- Paul Danilo – 1996
- Rick Davis – 2001
- Clint Dempsey - 2022
- Walter Dick – 1989
- Nicholas DiOrio – 1974
- Aldo Donelli – 1954
- Landon Donovan – 2023
- Thomas Dooley – 2010
- Jimmy Douglas – 1954
- Tommy Duggan – 1955
- Jimmy Dunn – 1974
- Alex Ely – 1997
- Marco Etcheverry – 2022
- Joy Fawcett – 2009
- Jock Ferguson – 1950
- Tommy Fleming – 2005
- Thomas Florie – 1986
- Julie Foudy – 2007
- Werner Fricker – 1992
- Brad Friedel – 2018
- William Fryer – 1951
- Joe Gaetjens – 1976
- Jimmy Gallagher – 1986
- Gino Gardassanich – 1976
- James Gentle – 1986
- Rudy Getzinger – 1991
- Teddy Glover – 1965
- Billy Gonsalves – 1950
- Bob Gormley – 1989
- Sheldon Govier – 1950
- Tobin Heath – 2026
- Karl-Heinz Granitza – 2003
- Joseph Gryzik – 1973
- Mia Hamm – 2007
- Linda Hamilton – 2022
- Al Harker – 1979
- John Harkes – 2005
- Mary Harvey – 2025
- April Heinrichs – 1998
- Shannon Higgins – 2002
- Lauren Holiday – 2023
- Tim Howard - 2024
- Jack Hynes – 1977
- Johnny Jaap – 1953
- Carin Jennings-Gabarra – 2000
- Cobi Jones – 2011
- Kasey Keller – 2015
- Harry Keough – 1976
- Nicholas Kropfelder – 1996
- Rudolph Kuntner – 1963
- Alexi Lalas – 2006
- Millard Lang – 1950
- Bob Lenarduzzi – 2003
- Kristine Lilly – 2014
- Carli Lloyd – 2025
- William Looby – 2001
- Joe Maca – 1976
- Kate Markgraf – 2023
- Arnie Mausser – 2003
- Brian McBride – 2014
- Pat McBride – 1994
- Bart McGhee – 1986
- Johnny McGuire – 1951
- Ed McIlvenny – 1976
- Josh McKinney – 2024
- Benny McLaughlin – 1981
- Shannon MacMillan – 2016
- Alex McNab – 2005
- Tony Meola – 2012
- Werner Mieth – 1974
- Tiffany Milbrett – 2018
- Robert Millar – 1950
- Lloyd Monsen – 1994
- Joe-Max Moore – 2013
- Johnny Moore – 1997
- George Moorhouse – 1986
- Jaime Moreno – 2021
- Robert Morrison – 1951
- Ed Murphy – 1998
- Bruce Murray – 2011
- Glenn Myernick – 2015
- John Nanoski – 1993
- John Nelson – 2005
- Werner Nilsen – 2005
- Patrick Ntsoelengoe – 2003
- Shamus O'Brien – 1990
- Heather O'Reilly – 2026
- Gene Olaff – 1971
- Arnold Oliver – 1968
- Len Oliver – 1996
- Carla Overbeck – 2006
- Gino Pariani – 1976
- Cindy Parlow – 2018
- Bert Patenaude – 1971
- Christie Pearce – 2021
- Pelé – 1993
- Hugo Perez – 2008
- Eddie Pope – 2011
- Preki – 2010
- Tab Ramos – 2005
- Harry Ratican – 1950
- Peter Renzulli – 1951
- Claudio Reyna – 2012
- Jimmy Roe – 1997
- Kyle Rote, Jr. – 2010
- Werner Roth – 1989
- Willy Roy – 1989
- Nick Rimando – 2025
- Francis Ryan – 1958
- Fabri Salcedo – 2005
- Tony Sanneh – 2026
- Willy Schaller – 1995
- Briana Scurry – 2017
- Philip Slone – 1986
- Bobby Smith – 2007
- Hope Solo – 2022
- Ed Souza – 1976
- John Souza – 1976
- Dick Spalding – 1950
- Archie Stark – 1950
- Earnie Stewart – 2011
- Thomas Swords – 1951
- George Tintle – 1952
- Raphael Tracey – 1986
- Al Trost – 2006
- Frank Vaughn – 1986
- Tisha Venturini-Hoch – 2024
- Peter Vermes – 2013
- Frank Wallace – 1976
- Abby Wambach – 2019
- Alex Weir – 1975
- Alan Willey – 2003
- Bruce Wilson – 2003
- Peter Wilson – 1950
- Mike Windischmann – 2004
- Adam Wolanin – 1976
- Chris Wondolowski – 2026
- Alexander Wood – 1986
- Eric Wynalda – 2004
- Al Zerhusen – 1978
- Steve Zungul – 2023

=== Builders ===
- Mark Abbott – 2025
- Umberto Abronzino – 1971
- Milton Aimi – 1991
- Julius Garcia Alonso – 1972
- William Anderson – 1956
- Philip Anschutz – 2006
- John Ardizzone – 1971
- Bruce Arena – 2010
- James Armstrong – 1952
- Esse Baharmast – 2022
- Joseph J. Barriskill – 1953
- Clay Berling – 1995
- John O. Best – 1982
- Joseph Booth – 1952
- Matthew Boxer – 1961
- Bob Bradley – 2014
- Gordon Bradley – 1996
- Lawrence E. Briggs – 1978
- John Brock – 1950
- Andrew M. Brown – 1950
- Thomas W. Cahill – 1950
- Bob Contiguglia – 2018
- Walter Chyzowych – 1997
- John Coll – 1986
- George M. Collins – 1951
- Peter Collins – 1998
- Colin Commander – 1967
- Ted Cordery – 1975
- Robert B. Craddock – 1959
- Edmund Craggs – 1969
- George Craggs – 1981
- Wilfred R. Cummings – 1953
- Joseph Delach – 1973
- Enzo DeLuca – 1979
- Tony DiCicco – 2012
- Edward J. Donaghy – 1951
- George Donnelly – 1989
- Anson Dorrance – 2008
- John W. Dresmich – 1968
- Duncan Duff – 1972
- Gene Edwards – 1985
- Jill Ellis – 2023
- Rudy Epperlein – 1951
- Ahmet Ertegun – 2003
- Nesuhi Ertegun – 2003
- Harry Fairfield – 1951
- Ernst Feibusch – 1984
- John A. Fernley – 1951
- Charles Ferro – 1958
- George E. Fishwick – 1954
- Jack Flamhaft – 1964
- Harry G. Fleming – 1967
- Powys A.L. Foulds – 1953
- Samuel T.N. Foulds – 1969
- Daniel W. Fowler – 1970
- Margaret Fowler – 1979
- Bob Gansler – 2011
- Don Garber – 2016 (deferred to 2018)
- Pete Garcia – 1964
- Walter Giesler – 1962
- David Gould – 1953
- Donald Greer – 1985
- Bob Guelker – 1980
- G.K. Guennel – 1980
- Sunil Gulati – 2019
- George Healey – 1951
- Herbert Heilpern – 1988
- William Hemmings – 1961
- Bob Hermann – 2001
- Ted Howard – 2003
- Maurice Hudson – 1966
- Lamar Hunt – 1982
- Alfredda Iglehart – 1951
- William Jeffrey – 1951
- Jack Johnston – 1952
- Mike Kabanica – 1987
- John Kalloch – 1964
- Bob Kehoe – 1989
- Frank J. Kelly – 1994
- George Kempton – 1950
- Paul Klein – 1953
- Alfred Kleinaitis – 1995
- Oscar Koszma – 1964
- Frank Kracher – 1983
- Raymond G. Kraft – 1984
- Harry Kraus – 1963
- Kurt Lamm – 1979
- Bertil Larson – 1988
- Horace Edgar Lewis – 1950
- Giuseppe "Joseph" Lombardo – 1984
- Dennis Long – 1993
- John J. MacEwan – 1953
- Joe Machnik – 2017
- Enzo Magnozzi – 1977
- Jack Maher – 1970
- G. Randolph Manning – 1950
- Francisco Marcos – 2024
- John Marre – 1953
- Allan McClay – 1971
- Frank J. McGrath – 1978
- James McGuire – 1951
- Dent McSkimming – 1951
- Peter Merovich – 1971
- Al Miller – 1995
- Milton Miller – 1971
- Jimmy Mills – 1954
- James Moore – 1971
- William Morrissette – 1967
- Fred Netto – 1958
- Ron Newman – 1992
- Dimitrious Niotis – 1963
- William Palmer – 1952
- Kevin Payne – 2021
- Edward Pearson – 1990
- Peter Peel – 1951
- Wally Peters – 1967
- Don Phillipson – 1987
- Giorgio Piscopo – 1978
- Edgar Pomeroy – 1955
- Arnold Ramsden – 1957
- Vernon R. Reese – 1957
- J. Eugene Ringsdorf – 1979
- Elizabeth Robbie – 2003
- Joe Robbie – 2003
- Steve Ross – 2003
- Jack J. Rottenberg – 1971
- Thomas Sagar – 1968
- Harry Saunders – 1981
- Manfred Schellscheidt – 1990
- Emil Schillinger – 1960
- Sigi Schmid – 2015
- Elmer Schroeder – 1951
- Ernő Schwarz – 1951
- Kari Seitz – 2026
- Fred Shields – 1968
- Erwin Single – 1981
- Alfred A. Smith – 1951
- Patrick Smith – 1998
- Reinhold Spath – 1996
- Nicolaas Steelink – 1971
- Hank Steinbrecher – 2005
- Lee Stern – 2003
- August Steuer – 1969
- Douglas T. Stewart – 1950
- Robert T. Stone – 1971
- Clive Toye – 2003
- Joseph Triner – 1952
- James A. Walder – 1971
- Adolph Washauer – 1977
- Thomas Webb – 1987
- Victor Weston – 1956
- John Wood – 1953
- Phil Woosnam – 1997
- Jerry Yeagley – 1989
- John Young – 1958
- Daniel Zampini – 1963

== Colin Jose Media Award ==
The Colin Jose Media Award is an honor bestowed on members of the media whose contributions to soccer in the United States are deemed of an "exceptional and sustained" quality. The award is named for Colin Jose, who served as official historian of the National Soccer Hall of Fame from 1997 to 2007, and who is recognized internationally as the preeminent authority on the history of soccer in North America.

- 2004: Jerry Trecker
- 2005: Seamus Malin
- 2007: George Tiedemann
- 2008: Ike Kuhns
- 2009: Alex Yannis
- 2010: Paul Gardner
- 2012: Grahame L. Jones
- 2013: George Vecsey
- 2016: Paul Kennedy
- 2017: Jim Trecker
- 2018: JP Dellacamera
- 2019: Tony Quinn (photographer)
- 2020: Andrés Cantor
- 2023: Grant Wahl
- 2024: Amy Rosenfeld
- 2025: Bob Ley
- 2026: Steven Goff

== MLS Hall of Fame Game ==
The MLS Hall of Fame Game was an annual friendly match between two MLS teams. It corresponded with the induction of the National Soccer Hall of Fame. The game took place at At-A-Glance Field in Oneonta, NY.

Date	Winning team	Score	Losing team	Score
October 11, 2004	MetroStars	2	Chicago Fire	0
August 29, 2005	D.C. United	6	Colorado Rapids	2
September 6, 2006	New York Red Bulls	vs.	Columbus Crew	

== See also ==
- St. Louis Soccer Hall of Fame
- List of members of the National Soccer Hall of Fame
- United Soccer Coaches Hall of Fame
