= Beardsworth =

Beardsworth is an English surname. Notable people with the surname include:

- Fred Beardsworth (1899–1964), English footballer
- Reginald St John Beardsworth Battersby (1900–1977), British army officer
