= Mark Abbott =

Mark Abbott may refer to:

- Mark Abbott (executive) (born 1964), American soccer executive
- Mark Abbott (rugby union) (born 1990), New Zealand rugby union player
- Mark R. Abbott, American oceanographer
