= Charlie Colombo =

American soccer player

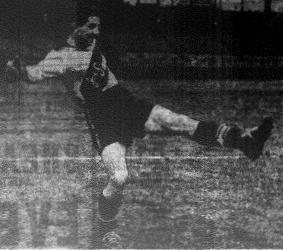
- Colombo in 1950

Personal information
- Date of birth: July 20, 1920
- Place of birth: St. Louis, Missouri, U.S.
- Date of death: May 7, 1986 (aged 65)
- Place of death: St. Louis, Missouri, U.S.
- Position: Center-half

Senior career*
Years	Team	Apps	(Gls)
- St. Louis Simpkins-Ford

International career
1948–1952	United States	11	(0)
- * Club domestic league appearances and goals

Charles Martin Colombo (July 20, 1920 – May 7, 1986) was an American soccer player who earned 11 caps as center-half for the United States men's national soccer team. He is a member of the National Soccer Hall of Fame. He also played for the United States at the 1948 Summer Olympics.

== Biography ==
Born and raised in The Hill area of St. Louis, Missouri, Colombo played professionally for St. Louis Simpkins-Ford, winning National Challenge Cup medals with them in 1948 and 1950. He was known as "Gloves" because he always wore gloves when he played, regardless of the weather.

Colombo played for the U.S. team from 1948 to 1952, including the 1–0 upset victory over England in the 1950 FIFA World Cup, in which his foul against Blackpool forward Stanley Mortensen in the second half gave England the chance to tie the game. The header from the resulting free kick came very close to scoring a goal, but was saved by goalkeeper Frank Borghi at the last second.

The day after U.S. victory, Colombo was offered an opportunity to play professional soccer in Brazil, but he turned it down and returned to his St. Louis club team. He later became the coach of the St. Louis Ambrose team.

He is buried in Old Saints Peter and Paul Catholic Cemetery, in St Louis, Missouri.
