= Gino Pariani =

American soccer player

Personal information
- Full name: Virginio Peter Pariani
- Date of birth: February 21, 1928
- Place of birth: St. Louis, Missouri, United States
- Date of death: May 9, 2007 (aged 79)
- Place of death: St. Louis, Missouri, United States
- Height: 5 ft 8 in (1.73 m)
- Position: Inside right

Senior career*
Years	Team	Apps	(Gls)
1943	Schumachers		
1943–1947	Raftery's		
1947–?	St. Louis Simpkins-Ford		
- Calcaterra
- Wildcats A.C.

International career
1948–1950	United States	5	(1)
- * Club domestic league appearances and goals

Virginio Peter Pariani (February 21, 1928 – May 9, 2007) was an American soccer striker. He earned 5 caps and scored 1 goal for the United States men's national soccer team, and played on the 1950 FIFA World Cup team, including the U.S. team's historic 1–0 victory over England. He was also a member of the U.S. Olympic team in London in 1948. He was inducted into the National Soccer Hall of Fame in 1976.

== Youth ==
Pariani grew up in a working-class Italian neighborhood called The Hill in St. Louis, Missouri. The younger of two brothers, Pariani's childhood consisted primarily of school, working at a local laundromat and playing street sports. Pariani joined a local youth club when he was thirteen.

== Club career ==
In 1943, Pariani joined Schumachers when he was fifteen. That year, he won his first title, a St. Louis Municipal League championship, with Schumachers. He then moved to Raftery's S.C. and remained with them through the 1946–1947 season. That year he was voted the league MVP. In 1947, Carrenti Cleaners came under new sponsorship. The renamed team, now known as St. Louis Simpkins-Ford, recruited Pariani. He would experience considerable success with Simpkins, winning the 1948 and 1950 U.S. Open Cup championships. He continued to play until 1963. Some time during his career, he also played for Calcaterra and Wildcats A.C. Pariani was a St. Louis all-star selection every year from 1946 through 1953.

== National and Olympic team ==
His success at the club level led to Pariani's selection to the U.S. soccer team at the 1948 Summer Olympics. The U.S. lost 9–0 to Italy in the first round of this single elimination tournament. Pariani did not play in this loss.

Pariani gained his first caps with the U.S. national team in an 11–0 loss to Norway on August 6, 1948. His second cap came five days later in a loss to Northern Ireland. He did not play again with the full national team until the 1950 FIFA World Cup. The invitation into the team came unexpectedly and Pariani had scheduled his wedding during the finals. With the support of both families, he and his fiancé moved up the day to allow him to play in Brazil. When he left St. Louis for New York, he had been married for only three days. He went on to score the lone U.S. goal in the team's first game of the finals, a 3–1 loss to Spain. Four days later, he was a key part of the U.S. victory over England, maintaining good ball possession. He also sent Frank Wallace on a break towards the English goal, a break stopped by Alf Ramsey. The U.S. ultimately won the game, one of the greatest upsets of World Cup history. Pariani's last cap came in a 5–2 loss to Chile which put the U.S. out of the cup.

In January 2004, Pariani and the four other living members of the 1950 World Cup Team (Walter Bahr, Frank Borghi, Harry Keough and John Souza) were recognized as Honorary All-Americas by the National Soccer Coaches Association of America at its annual convention in Charlotte, N.C.

In 1976, he was inducted into the National Soccer Hall of Fame.

Pariani died of bone cancer in St. Louis, Missouri on May 9, 2007. He is buried in Resurrection Cemetery in Affton, Missouri.
