= United States v England (1950 FIFA World Cup) =

Association football match at the 1950 FIFA World Cup

Miracle of Belo Horizonte
- Event: 1950 FIFA World Cup group stage
United States	England
(United States)	(England)
1	0
- Date: 29 June 1950
- Venue: Estádio Independência, Belo Horizonte, Minas Gerais
- Referee: Generoso Dattilo (Italy)
- Attendance: 10,151 (official); 13,000 (reported)

United States 1 – 0 England was an association football match played on 29 June 1950, where the United States defeated England in the World Cup group match at Estádio Independência in Belo Horizonte, Minas Gerais, Brazil.

Before the game, England were heavy favorites against a hastily assembled U.S. team, which was composed of part-time players. The game's only goal was scored by Haitian-born U.S. center forward Joe Gaetjens. This game and the U.S. team were profiled by author Geoffrey Douglas in his book The Game of Their Lives, which was made into a film of the same name (later renamed The Miracle Match). The match is widely considered as one of the greatest upsets in the history of the sport.

== Background ==
The 1950 FIFA World Cup was England's World Cup debut, the Football Association having boycotted the previous three tournaments owing to a dispute with FIFA over payments made to amateur players, which had been resolved four years earlier. England and the United States were both drawn in Group 2, along with Spain and Chile: under the rules of the competition only the group winner from this four-nation round-robin would progress to the final stage. Each team had played one previous match in the group, England having beaten Chile 2–0 and the United States losing 3–1 to Spain.

At the time, the English had a reputation as the "Kings of Football", with a post-war record of 23 wins, 4 losses, and 3 draws. They had beaten the Italians 4–0 and the Portuguese 10–0 in Lisbon two weeks before that. In comparison, the Americans, despite having reached the semi-finals of the inaugural 1930 World Cup, had lost their last seven international matches (including the 1934 World Cup and 1948 Summer Olympics) by the combined score of 45–2, including heavy losses to Italy (7–1), Norway (11–0) and Northern Ireland (5–0). The odds were 3–1 the English would win the Cup, and 500–1 for the U.S. The people from Belo Horizonte were eager to watch the English team, with 10,000 tickets sold along with 3,000 distributed to associates of Sete de Setembro Futebol Clube, then-owners of the newly inaugurated Estádio Independência.

England had Stanley Matthews available, who was widely considered one of the best players in the world at the time, but he had not played with the English team in the three international matches before the World Cup (in fact, he had joined the team late, having been touring Canada as part of another group of English internationals). As such, the selection committee (consisting entirely of Arthur Drewry, then president of The Football League in England and later the president of FIFA) opted to stay with the team that had just defeated Chile. Matthews would be saved for later, supposedly more difficult, opponents. As there were no substitutes allowed in the rules of football at the time, Matthews watched the game with the other reserves. Incidentally, the England team which toured Canada beat the United States team preparing for the World Cup 1–0 at the Triborough Stadium in New York City on 19 June, 10 days before the World Cup match, courtesy of a Johnny Hancocks goal.

The American team consisted of semi-professional players, most of whom had other jobs to support their families. Walter Bahr was a high school teacher, Frank Borghi drove a hearse for his uncle's funeral home and others worked as letter carriers or dishwashers. One player, Ben McLaughlin, had to withdraw from the tournament because he could not get time off work. The hastily assembled team had trained together only once, which happened to be on the day before they left for Brazil, against the touring English team featuring Matthews. (Matthews did not play in that game, as he was injured.) Three players—Joe Maca, Ed McIlvenny, and Joe Gaetjens, none of whom was a U.S. citizen—had been added to the roster just before that game. "We have no chance," recently appointed coach Bill Jeffrey told the press; he also declared his players "sheep ready to be slaughtered". The English Daily Express newspaper wrote: "It would be fair to give the U.S. three goals of a start."

== Match ==
=== Summary ===
==== First half ====
Although Walter Bahr regularly served as captain for the United States, Ed McIlvenny was selected for the role for this particular match "because he was British". England won the toss and elected to kick off. Within ninety seconds, Stanley Mortensen sent a cross from the left wing to Roy Bentley, who let off a shot that was barely pushed aside by U.S. goalkeeper Frank Borghi. By the 12th minute, England had six clear shots on goal but could not convert, with two shots hitting the post, one just going over the top, and another brilliantly saved by Borghi.

The U.S. struggled to move to the offense, and finally managed a shot on goal in the 25th minute, which was blocked by English goalkeeper Bert Williams. The English counterattacked with three successive clear shots at the goal in minutes 30, 31, and 32, but failed to score. Mortensen twice went over the crossbar, and Tom Finney's header to the top corner was tipped away by Borghi. In the 37th minute, Bahr took a long shot from 25 yards out, but as Williams moved to his right to intercept, Gaetjens dived headlong near the penalty spot, and grazed the ball enough to put it to the left of the English goalkeeper, whose momentum prevented him from changing direction, and into the back of the net. The crowd exploded as the U.S. improbably led 1–0. As the half drew to a close, Finney had a chance to equalize, but the whistle blew before he could shoot.

The crowd, initially 10,000, increased as Brazilian locals heard radio coverage of the match. The spectators were mostly supporting the underdog Americans, cheering with Borghi's saves and the unsuccessful English attacks. According to Bahr, "The overwhelming majority was Brazilians, but they rooted for us the entire time. We didn't realize why until after. They [were] hoping we would beat England and that Brazil would not have to play England in the final game." Some locals even jumped a short wall to enter the stadium through the playing field.

==== Second half ====
The U.S. played with renewed confidence as the second half opened, creating another scoring opportunity in the 54th minute. In the 59th minute England was awarded a direct free kick but Mortensen's shot was well saved by Borghi. England began threatening again, and it was fifteen minutes before the Americans were able to get another shot. With eight minutes left, Charlie Colombo brought down Mortensen with an illegal tackle at the edge of the penalty area. England pleaded for a penalty kick, but the referee ruled it was outside the box. From Alf Ramsey's resulting free kick, Jimmy Mullen headed the ball for what he thought was a goal, but Borghi tipped it away at the last instant, and despite the protests of the English players, the referee ruled that the ball had not crossed the line and thus there was no goal. England did not threaten again, but the U.S. had one final chance in the 85th minute: Frank "Peewee" Wallace drew Williams out of position and fired a shot at the empty net, only to be denied by a sliding goal line clearance by Ramsey.

=== Details ===
29 June 1950
15:00 BRT (UTC-3)

United States	1–0	England
Gaetjens 38'

Estádio Independência, Belo Horizonte
Attendance: 10,151
Referee: Generoso Dattilo (Italy)

United States	England

GK	Frank Borghi
RB	Harry Keough
LB	Joe Maca
RH	Ed McIlvenny (c)
CH	Charlie Colombo
LH	Walter Bahr
OR	Frank Wallace
IR	Gino Pariani
CF	Joe Gaetjens
IL	John Souza
OL	Ed Souza
Manager:
William Jeffrey

GK	Bert Williams
RB	Alf Ramsey
LB	John Aston
WH	Billy Wright (c)
CH	Laurie Hughes
WH	Jimmy Dickinson
OR	Tom Finney
IF	Wilf Mannion
CF	Roy Bentley
IF	Stan Mortensen
OL	Jimmy Mullen
Manager:
Walter Winterbottom

Assistant referees:
Charles de la Salle (France)
Giovanni Galeati (Italy)

== Post-match ==
=== Remaining matches ===
Even after this loss, England could have kept their chances alive by winning their final pool match against Spain, a result which would have forced a play-off for the right to progress to the final stage of the competition. However, they were unable to do this, losing 1–0, and finishing the group stage with a record of 1–0–2. The U.S. also lost their next match 5–2, versus Chile, ending their 1950 World Cup run with a group stage record of 1–0–2. Spain advanced to the four-team Final Round, finishing fourth.

=== Aftermath ===
John Souza, the U.S. inside right forward, was selected to the World Cup All-Star team by the Brazilian sports newspaper Mundo Esportivo, and remained the only U.S. player selected to a World Cup All-Star team until Claudio Reyna in 2002. Newspaper headlines in most World Cup nations trumpeted the shocking upset, except ironically in the United States and England. There was only one U.S. journalist at the World Cup: Dent McSkimming of the St. Louis Post-Dispatch; he could not persuade the newspaper to pay for the trip, and had taken time off work to cover the event. McSkimming's report of the match was one of the few to appear in a major U.S. newspaper; some other journals carried agency reports of the match.

In England, newspapers at the time were generally small, and had only a few pages devoted to sports. Because the English cricket team happened to suffer their first-ever home defeat to the West Indies the very same day, that was the major story in many publications. The team's performance was nonetheless excoriated, with headlines such as "England Caned At Soccer Too", and "The Last Straw – U.S. Beat England In World Cup". Many newspapers repeated Arthur Drewry's statement that the defeat was "unbelievable".

Legend has it that in publications that did report the World Cup match, so unexpected was the result that it was presumed that the 1–0 scoreline was a typing error and so it was reported that England had won on a scoreline of 10–0 or 10–1. However, historical newspapers online at the British Newspaper Archive show that the story is a myth. Afterwards, a number of books and newspapers in England suggested that the U.S. team had arrived "through Ellis Island", meaning that the team was made up of imported players. In actuality, eight of the starting eleven were U.S.-born, while the other three, Gaetjens, McIlvenny, and Maca, were not U.S. citizens, but had declared their intentions to gain citizenship (only Maca ultimately became a U.S. citizen in 1957), and according to the rules of the United States Soccer Federation at the time, were allowed to play. The U.S. was cleared of any wrongdoing by FIFA in a hearing on 2 December 1950. Of the eight U.S.-born starters, five were from St. Louis, Missouri.

England's blue kit, which had made its debut in this match, was never worn again. Although Walter Bahr once stated that England has never had a blue kit since then, the England team did wear blue in 1959 during a 1–4 away loss to Peru, and wore a blue strip on several occasions in the 21st century. The 1950 loss was the second of several shock losses for the English team. In 1949 they lost at home to Ireland 0-2, and in 1953, they were defeated 6–3 by the "Magical Magyars" of Hungary and in 1954, they lost again to Hungary 7–1. The result of these losses was a reorganization of English football that culminated in England winning the 1966 World Cup on home soil.

There was little attention given to the match in the U.S. at the time, and that continued to be the case until the 1994 World Cup, which was hosted in the U.S. Geoffrey Douglas, a professor of English at the University of Massachusetts Amherst, was inspired by news articles in the build-up to the 1994 tournament, and wrote a book about the 1950 match, having interviewed the five surviving members of the U.S. team. Entitled The Game of Their Lives, it was made into a 2005 film of the same name directed by David Anspaugh. Since then, the game has become known as "The Miracle Match" or "Miracle on Grass", in reference to the "Miracle on Ice" from the 1980 Winter Olympics, in which the U.S. ice hockey team defeated the heavily favored Soviet Union. The United States and England have played two World Cup matches against each other since 1950: a match in the group stage of the 2010 FIFA World Cup, which ended in a 1–1 draw, and another group stage match in the 2022 FIFA World Cup, which ended drawn 0–0.

== See also ==
- England at the FIFA World Cup
- United States at the FIFA World Cup
