= Andrew Brown (soccer, born 1870) =

Scottish-American soccer executive (1870–1948)

Andrew M. Brown (1870 – August 10, 1948) was a Scottish-American soccer player, executive and coach who had a short tenure as coach of the United States men's national soccer team.

Born in Paisley, Scotland, Brown moved to the U.S. at the age of twenty, settling in Philadelphia to play soccer. During the 1909–10 season he served as the vice-president of the Eastern Soccer League.

He was president of the American Football Association, and was instrumental in that organization's 1913 merger with the American Amateur Association, which formed the United States Football Association. He later became the president of the USFA, a position he held during the 1928 Soccer Wars.

Brown was posthumously inducted into the National Soccer Hall of Fame in 1950, having died in Ravenna, Ohio on August 10, 1948.
