= Geoff Coombes =

American soccer player

Geoff "Jeff" Coombes
Personal information
- Full name: Geoffrey Coombes
- Date of birth: April 23, 1919
- Place of birth: Lincoln, Lincolnshire, England
- Date of death: December 5, 2002 (aged 83)
- Place of death: Rockledge, Florida, United States
- Positions: Half back; forward

Senior career*
Years	Team	Apps	(Gls)
1946	Chicago Vikings		
1946	Detroit Wolverines		
1947	Detroit Pioneers		
1947–?	Chicago Vikings		
- * Club domestic league appearances and goals

Geoffrey Coombes (April 23, 1919 – December 5, 2002) was an American soccer player who was a member of the U.S. team at the 1950 FIFA World Cup.

== Youth ==
Coombes grew up in High Wycombe, England where he was a multi-sport prep athlete. His club team went to the Berks & Bucks Minor Cup. Despite being offered a trial with Nottingham Forest F.C., he never played above the youth level in England. In 1935, he moved to the United States with his family.

== Playing career ==
Coombes played soccer in Michigan, gaining enough recognition to be selected to a Michigan All Star team in 1939. While he served in the U.S. Army during World War II, he never deployed overseas. After the war, he returned to Michigan, settling in Detroit. In 1946, he joined the Chicago Vikings as they won the National Challenge Cup. However, he did not play with the Vikings in the 1946 North American Soccer Football League season but joined the Detroit Wolverines which won the league title that year. In 1947, new ownership changed the team's name to the Detroit Pioneers. The Pioneers finished fifth in the spring 1947 season. In the fall of 1947, the league folded and Coombes returned to the Chicago Vikings which now competed in the National Soccer League of Chicago. In 1948, the Vikings won the league title. He remained with the Vikings through at least the 1950 season.

== National team ==
While Coombes was selected to the U.S. roster for the 1950 FIFA World Cup, he never entered a game.

== Non soccer career ==
When Coombes returned to Detroit after World War II, he was hired by the Palmer Bee Company. He later worked as a soccer promoter, a newspaper columnist and soccer league president.

Coombes was inducted, along with the rest of the 1950 U.S. World Cup team, into the National Soccer Hall of Fame in 1976.
