= Lawrence Briggs =

American soccer coach (1903–1970)

Personal information
- Full name: Lawrence E. Briggs
- Date of birth: June 23, 1903
- Date of death: December 1970 (aged 67)
- Place of death: Boston, Massachusetts

Managerial career
- Years: Team
- 1930–1967: UMass Minutemen

Lawrence E. Briggs (June 23, 1903 – December 1970) was an American soccer coach who is best known for being the first men's soccer coach for the UMass Minutemen soccer program. Additionally, Briggs is known for being a founder of the National Soccer Coaches Association of America and served as their president in 1947. He was also a founding member of the now-defunct New England Intercollegiate Soccer League which served as a foundation for modern college soccer in the United States.

Briggs was enshrined in the National Soccer Hall of Fame in 1978.
