= Prudencio Garcia =

American soccer referee (1899–1984)

Prudencio "Pete" Garcia (October 2, 1899 – November 15, 1984) was a Spanish-born American soccer referee. He was the first American referee to participate in a FIFA World Cup. Garcia, who served as a linesman in four games at the 1950 FIFA World Cup in Brazil, is a member of the U.S. National Soccer Hall of Fame.

== Legacy ==
A photo of Garcia holding an American flag as a child was the poster for the debut of the exhibition called "Invisible Emigrants: Spaniards in the United States, 1868–1945", at the Conde Duque in Madrid, Spain, running January 23 – April 12, 2020 Garcia was profiled in the Sunday magazine Cronica El Mundo in an article by reporter Dario Prieto titled "Prudencio, el Primer Arbitro Yanqui Era Asturiano," published in Madrid on January 12, 2020.

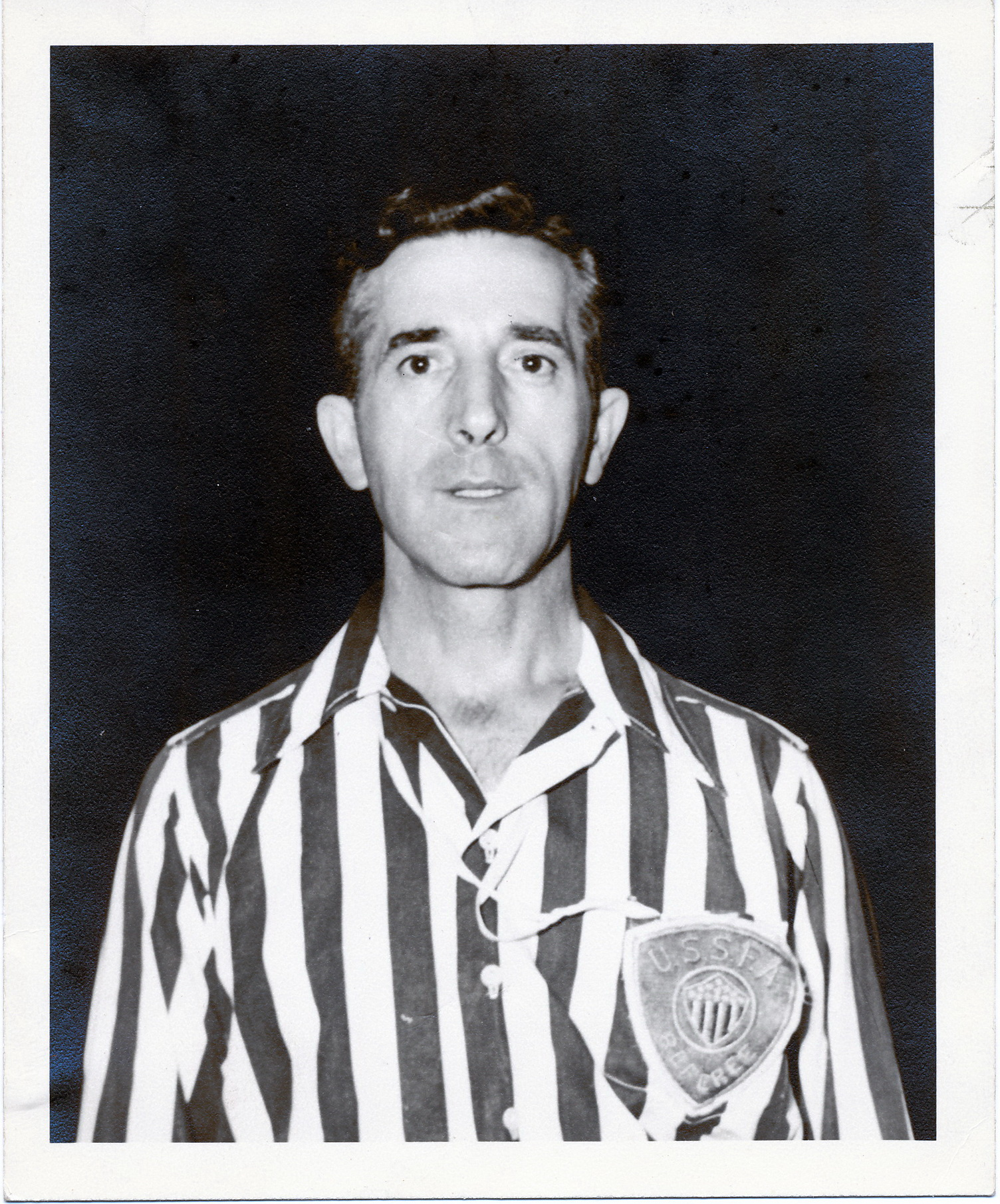
Prudencio Pete Garcia 1950 World Cup Referee taken by Robert Broyles

In 2025, Prudencio "Pete" García was again prominently featured in the exhibition Invisible Immigrants. Spaniards in the U.S. (1868–1945) at the Tampa Bay History Center in Tampa, Florida. The photo of García as a child shortly after his arrival in St. Louis, Missouri, was used as the primary promotional image for this United States debut of the exhibit. The exhibition, curated by NYU Professor James D. Fernández and journalist Luis Argeo, presented over 300 historical photographs, documents, and audiovisual materials from more than 15,000 archival items related to the Spanish diaspora in the U.S.

== Youth ==
Born in Salinas, Asturias, Spain on October 2, 1899, Prudencio Garcia immigrated to the United States as a child. He came to the U.S. in May 1907 with his mother and one sister when he was six years old. His father was already in the United States having arrived in 1905. Several of his brothers stayed and lived in Cuba before eventually coming to the United States. His family moved to St. Louis, Missouri where he completed primary school at Blow School in Carondelet, a neighborhood in the extreme southeastern portion of St. Louis.

== Professional ==
After completing bookkeeping courses at night, Garcia worked for the Mercantile Commerce Bank and Trust Company in St. Louis until he retired in 1965. He co-founded the Spanish Society in St. Louis with his brother-in-law Benito “Chic” Fernandez in 1927.

== Soccer referee career ==
Garcia was one of the leading figures in the sport of soccer in St. Louis' large Spanish community, organizing teams, leagues and referees' associations in Missouri and southern Illinois for decades after immigrating to St. Louis from Spain as a child. Garcia was a player for teams in St. Louis from 1911 to 1921. He then started officiating in St. Louis Public School and Police Youth leagues. He refereed in the Municipal League of St. Louis from 1937 to 1957 and was a founder of Missouri Referees Association. Garcia also was selected to referee U.S. national soccer team games played in St. Louis against national and club teams from other countries.

Garcia became the first American to serve as an official at a World Cup when he was named to FIFA's panel of referees at the 1950 World Cup in Brazil. At the 1950 World Cup, Garcia was a linesman at four games, two in the group stage and two in the final group, including the match for third place between Sweden and Spain. Only two other referees in the pool of 26 referees for the 1950 World Cup worked as many games as Garcia He worked the group stage games between Paraguay and Sweden in Curitiba, Brazil and between Paraguay and Italy in São Paulo. Prior to the match for third place, Garcia worked the round of four game between Brazil and Sweden, where almost 139,000 people filled the newly built Maracanã Stadium in Rio de Janeiro.

Garcia finished his career as a FIFA referee at the end of 1952 and retired as a referee in 1957. Seven years after his retirement, Garcia was inducted into the National Soccer Hall of Fame in 1964. He was inducted into the St. Louis Soccer Hall of Fame in 1975

== Archives ==
The Garcia Soccer Collection, 1936–1980, is an archive of his papers at Southern Illinois University Edwardsville. The collection is described as: "The Garcia Soccer Collection represents the holdings of Prudencio "Pete" Garcia of St. Louis, Missouri who was active in soccer circles as a player, referee and administrator from 1911 until the 1970s. It includes many items of personal and professional correspondence as well as guidebooks, rule books, records books, various soccer publications and programs of local, national, and international soccer activities."

== Personal ==
In St. Louis on June 18, 1927 Garcia married Adoracion "Dora" Fernandez, who was born in Santa Maria del Mar, Asturias, Spain. The couple had three children.

Garcia died on November 15, 1984, in Arlington, Virginia, where he and his wife were living with their son, Donald R. Garcia. Garcia is buried at Mount Hope Cemetery Mausoleum and Crematory in Lemay, St. Louis County, Missouri.
