= Mark Abbott (executive) =

American sports executive (born 1964)

- Born: August 20, 1964 (age 61); England
- Occupation: Sports executive
- Employer: Major League Soccer (1993–2022)
- Known for: First employee and longtime executive of Major League Soccer
- Title: President, Deputy Commissioner
- Spouse: Mareta Hamre
- Awards: National Soccer Hall of Fame (2025)

Mark Abbott (born August 20, 1964) is an American sports executive. He was the first employee of Major League Soccer in 1993, and held positions including chief operating officer, president and deputy commissioner. He retired at the end of 2022, and was inducted into the National Soccer Hall of Fame for 2025.

== Biography ==
Abbott was born in England. In August 1972, his father Fred moved to Oakdale, Minnesota to work for 3M. In 1974, Fred Abbott was hired by the city of Maplewood to start a soccer program, and 10-year-old Mark Abbott was one of the first players.

Abbott graduated from UC Berkeley School of Law. In 1993, he was hired by United States Soccer Federation president Alan Rothenberg for a non-sporting matter, when he heard that Rothenberg wanted someone to write a business plan for the national professional soccer league that the United States had to produce as per its hosting of the 1994 FIFA World Cup. Abbott had not made a business plan before, but was hired for his interest in soccer, and became the first employee of what would become Major League Soccer. He took a three-month leave in June 1993 to start the role.

Abbott began his position in a windowless closet. He was tasked with getting financiers, sponsors, players and broadcasters for the new league. The league came close to bankruptcy in the early 2000s, but received a boost in 2007 with the signing of David Beckham to the LA Galaxy. Abbott was appointed as chief operating officer in 1997, MLS president in 2006 and deputy commissioner to Don Garber in 2013. He announced in November 2021 that he would leave at the end of the following year.

== Personal life ==
After MLS relocated from Los Angeles to New York City, Abbott commuted from California before moving to Greenwich, Connecticut around the year 2000. In September 2023, he and his wife Mareta Hamre were appointed as executive-in-residence and a research fellow, respectively, at Georgetown University.

== Recognition ==
In December 2024, Abbott was elected to the National Soccer Hall of Fame in the "Builders" category. He was inducted at the site in Frisco, Texas on May 3, 2025.
