= John Wood (footballer, born 1884) =

English footballer, referee, and coach (1884–1959)

Personal information
- Date of birth: 1884
- Place of birth: Nottingham, England
- Date of death: 1959 (aged 74–75)
- Place of death: Nashville, Tennessee, United States
- 1952: United States

John W. Wood (1884–1959) was an English association football player, referee and coach who was briefly head coach of the United States men's national soccer team. He was born in Nottingham, England. Upon emigrating to the US, Wood played for several teams on the east coast. He later became the soccer coach at Oak Park High School in Oak Park, Illinois.

Wood led the American team at the 1952 Summer Olympics, and was inducted into the National Soccer Hall of Fame that same year. Former head coach Walter Giesler served as manager for the 1952 squad. The team played one game at those games, losing a qualifier to Italy 8–0.
