= Jimmy Roe =

American soccer player

Personal information
- Full name: James Roe
- Date of birth: December 27, 1908
- Place of birth: St. Louis, Missouri, United States
- Date of death: August 21, 1999 (aged 90)
- Place of death: St. Charles, Missouri, United States
- Position: Inside left

Youth career
- Christian Brothers College

Senior career*
Years	Team	Apps	(Gls)
1928–1929	Marres		
1929	St. Matthew's		
1929–1930	Russell Florists		
1931–1934	Stix, Baer and Fuller		
1934–1935	→ St. Louis Central Breweries		
1935–1937	→ St. Louis Shamrocks		
- * Club domestic league appearances and goals

Jimmy Roe (December 27, 1908 – August 8, 1999) was a U.S. soccer inside left who spent his entire career in the St. Louis leagues. He was called into the national team in 1937, but suffered a career ending knee injury before his first game with the team. He was inducted into the National Soccer Hall of Fame in 1997.

== Youth ==
Roe began playing organized soccer with his school, team St. Matthew School which was among the best teams in the St. Louis Catholic Youth Council. He attended Christian Brothers College High School where he also played soccer and is a member of the CBC Alumni Hall of Fame.

== Professional ==
In 1928, he joined Marres, a semi-professional team in the St. Louis Municipal (MUNY) League. The MUNY was the city's de facto second division, sitting below the professional St. Louis Soccer League (SLSL). At some point, he moved to St. Matthew's. In 1929, Row began the season with Russell Florists, but, according to the National Soccer Hall of Fame, he moved to Stix, Baer and Fuller F.C. (SBF) of the SLSL during the season. This is not possible as SBF was not established until 1931. In 1932, SBF went to the National Challenge Cup final where it lost to the New Bedford Whalers. The next year, Roe and his teammates ran off a string of National Cup victories, taking the 1933 and 1934 titles. Following the 1933 win, SBF played Toronto Scottish for the one time North American Soccer Championship, which Scottish won 2–1. In 1934, St. Louis Central Breweries took over sponsorship of the team, renaming the it. This did not stop Roe and his teammates from winning the 1935 National Cup. Central Breweries dropped its sponsorship in 1935 and the team competed as the independent St. Louis Shamrocks. The Shamrocks went to the 1936 and 1937 National Cup finals, but finished runner up in both.

== National team ==
In September 1937, Roe was called into the U.S. national team for a three-game series with Mexico. However, he suffered a career-ending injury before playing a minute.

Roe was inducted into the St. Louis Soccer Hall of Fame and the National Soccer Hall of Fame in 1997.
