= Umberto Abronzino =

American soccer player (1920–2006)

Personal information
- Date of birth: 16 November 1920
- Date of death: 1 July 2006 (aged 85)

Umberto Abronzino (16 November 1920 – 1 July 2006) was a prominent player, promoter and organizer of soccer in the United States during the 20th century. He was inducted into the National Soccer Hall of Fame in 1971 for his lifelong dedication to building the sport of soccer. Abronzino was elected to the California Soccer Association Hall of Fame in 1964 and the California Youth Soccer Association Hall of Fame in 1979.

Born in Sessa Aurunca, Italy, Umberto Abronzino, played for the Lauro di Sessa team before he emigrated to the United States in 1937 as an accomplished soccer player. He worked as a barber in Hartford, Connecticut while playing for and managing several teams in the area until 1952.

Abronzino then moved to the San Francisco bay area where he opened a barber shop and helped organize the four-team Peninsula Soccer League, serving in a number of offices, including secretary/treasurer. The Peninsula Soccer League now has more than 60 men's teams and is an affiliate of the United States Soccer Federation. The Peninsula Soccer League was run from Abronzino's barber shop until his death.

He also organized a Sons of Italy soccer team in San Jose, California in 1959. He became an officer in the California Soccer Association. Abronzino helped organize California North Youth Soccer and served on the U.S. Soccer National Amateur Cup's organizing committee. He also worked as a referee and served on the CSFA Referees Commission. Abrozino served as financial secretary of the National Amateur Cup competitions and in 1994, became the MasterCard Ambassador of Soccer for Italy in the World Cup.
