= Dent McSkimming =

American sportswriter (1896–1976)

- Born: Florence Dent Archibald McSkimming; October 17, 1896; St. Louis, Missouri, U.S.
- Died: July 13, 1976 (aged 79)
- Education: Stanford University
- Occupation: Sportswriter
- Parent(s): George Francis McSkimming; Mary Teresa McCann McSkimming

Florence Dent Archibald McSkimming (October 17, 1896 – July 13, 1976) was an American sportswriter for several St. Louis newspapers. He was inducted into the National Soccer Hall of Fame in 1951.

McSkimming was born in St. Louis, Missouri to George Francis and Mary Teresa McCann McSkimming. Dent was the sixth of 10 children. He was named after Dent H. Robert and Florence D. White with whom his father worked at the St. Louis Post-Dispatch newspaper. He began his sportswriting career at the St. Louis Star in 1913 and switched to the St. Louis Post-Dispatch in 1922, where he worked until his retirement in 1961. He worked for a third St. Louis newspaper, the St. Louis Globe-Democrat as a police reporter.

During World War I, Dent McSkimming served as a pharmacist's mate on a Navy gunboat. In 1931, he worked at an English-language newspaper in Mexico City. McSkimming attended Stanford University for one year. During World War II, he served as a Red Cross field representative in Puerto Rico and the Panama Canal Zone.

== 1950 World Cup ==
McSkimming was the only American journalist at the 1950 World Cup in Brazil, though he paid his own way to the event when his employer decided not to send him to cover it. He witnessed the United States' historic upset of England at that tournament describing it as "if Oxford University sent a baseball team over here and it beat the Yankees."

Dent McSkimming was played by Terry Kinney as the younger Dent McSkimming and Patrick Stewart as the older McSkimming in the 2005 movie The Game of Their Lives, which has been distributed in DVD under the title "Miracle Match."
