= Bob Gormley =

American soccer player

Personal information
- Full name: Robert Gormley
- Date of birth: August 3, 1918
- Date of death: December 11, 2003 (aged 85)
- Place of death: Philadelphia, United States
- Position: Forward

Senior career*
Years	Team	Apps	(Gls)
1936–1937	Kensington Blue Bells		
1937–1954	Philadelphia German-Americans		

International career
1954	United States	1	(0)
- * Club domestic league appearances and goals

Robert Gormley (August 3, 1918 – December 11, 2003) was an American soccer forward who spent seventeen years in the American Soccer League. He also earned one cap with the U.S. national team in 1954. He was inducted into the National Soccer Hall of Fame in 1989.

Gormley was born and raised in Philadelphia, Pennsylvania, where he began playing youth soccer with the Lighthouse Boys Club before moving to another local club, the McKinley Soccer Club. In 1933, he signed with the Philadelphia German-Americans of the American Soccer League. However, he spent three years with the reserve team before leaving the team in 1936 to sign with the Kensington Blue Bells of the Eastern Pennsylvania League. After only one season, he returned to the German-Americans, where he spent the rest of his career. In 1937, he scored ten goals. In 1944, he scored sixteen goals in nineteen games. In 1947, he scored twelve goals in nineteen games and in 1948, he added another thirteen goals.

He ended his career in 1954 with the German-Americans, now known as Uhrik Truckers after having been purchased by the trucking company during the 1953–1954 season. During his seventeen years with the team, Gormley was captain for twelve. Gormley died in December 2003 at the age of 85.

== National team ==
In 1947, he played two U.S. exhibition games, which are not considered full internationals, against Israel. In the second of the two games, played on October 14, 1948, Gormley scored a goal in the 4-1 U.S. victory. Gormley did not play with the full U.S. national team until an April 3, 1954 victory over Haiti in a World Cup qualifier. By this game, the U.S. had already failed to qualify for the finals.
