= Rudy Getzinger =

American soccer player (born 1943)

Personal information
- Date of birth: April 9, 1943 (age 83)
- Place of birth: Sremska Mitrovica, Yugoslavia
- Position: Midfielder

Youth career
- 1956–1958: Schwaben AC

Senior career*
Years	Team	Apps	(Gls)
1958–1964	Schwaben AC		
1975-76	Chicago Sting		

International career
1972–1973	United States	8	(1)
- * Club domestic league appearances and goals

Rudy Getzinger (born April 9, 1943) is a retired soccer player who played as a midfielder. He was raised in Austria before coming to the US. He spent most of his career with Chicago-based teams, earned eight caps with the United States and is a member of the National Soccer Hall of Fame.

== Club career ==
Born in Sremska Mitrovica, Yugoslavia, Getzinger spent several years as a boy in Austria. In 1958, his family moved to the United States and settled in Chicago. When he arrived in Chicago, he joined the Schwaben AC soccer club as a youth player. That season, Schwaben won the Peel Cup. At the time that Getzinger joined the club, it was the dominant team in the National Soccer League of Chicago, having won the league title several consecutive seasons. Getzinger would spend most of his career with Schwaben, winning the National Amateur Cup with the team in 1964. In 1975, Chicago was awarded a North American Soccer League (NASL) franchise. The new team, named the Chicago Sting, drew on local talent to form the core of the roster. Getzinger spent the 1975 and 1976 seasons with the Sting, scoring one goal in sixteen games in 1975 and no goals in three games in 1976 as he was out with knee injuries most games. He quit playing professional soccer due to knee injuries.

== International career ==
In both 1963 and 1968, he was part of the U.S. Olympic soccer teams which failed to qualify for the 1964 and 1968 Summer Olympics. While Getzinger played with the Olympic team in both 1963 and 1968, he did not earn his first caps with the United States until 1972. He also played the Olympics during 1976. That year, he scored in his debut, an August 20, 1972 loss to Canada. He went on to play a total of eight caps, but scored only that one goal. His last cap came as a substitute for Barry Barto in a November 3, 1973 loss to Haiti.

In 1991, Getzinger was inducted into the National Soccer Hall of Fame.
