= Hank Steinbrecher =

American soccer executive, player and coach (1947–2025)

U.S. Soccer Secretary General
- In office 1990–2000

Personal details
- Born: July 11, 1947 Rockaway, New York, U.S.
- Died: March 25, 2025 (aged 77) Tucson, Arizona, U.S.
- Education: Davis & Elkins College; West Virginia University
- Occupation: Soccer coach and administrator
- Known for: General Secretary, US Soccer Federation
- Awards: National Soccer Hall of Fame

Hank Steinbrecher (July 11, 1947 – March 25, 2025) was an American soccer executive, player and coach, who was a member of the National Soccer Hall of Fame.

== Early career ==
Steinbrecher attended Davis & Elkins College, where he was a member of the school's 1970 NAIA national championship soccer team. He graduated from Davis & Elkins, then earned a master's degree in education from West Virginia University.

He began his coaching career at Warren Wilson College, where he served as head soccer coach and athletic director. He then coached the Appalachian State Mountaineers from 1978 to 1980, leading the team to three consecutive Southern Conference championships. He coached at Boston University from 1980 to 1984. From 1985 to 1990, he was the director of sports marketing for Quaker Oats Company, where he helped popularize the ritual of dumping a cooler of Gatorade on the head football coach in celebration after a victory.

== U.S. Soccer ==
On November 5, 1990, Steinbrecher became the Secretary General of the United States Soccer Federation. He took a lead role in marketing the sport and was directly involved in developing U.S. Soccer's sponsorship programs. He also oversaw the staging of the 1994 FIFA World Cup, the 1996 Summer Olympics Soccer Tournament, and the 1999 FIFA Women's World Cup. He stepped down from his position in February 2000.

== Accolades ==
Steinbrecher was inducted into the National Soccer Hall of Fame as a builder in 2005. In 2012, he received the Werner Fricker Builder Award, which honors those "who have established a lasting legacy in the history and structure of soccer in the United States."

He was also a member of the New England Soccer Hall of Fame, the Eastern New York Soccer Hall of Fame, and the North Carolina Soccer Hall of Fame.

The Hank Steinbrecher Cup is a USASA competition started in 2013 that crowns the National Amateur Champions.

== Personal life and death ==
On March 25, 2025, Steinbrecher died in Tucson, Arizona, at the age of 77.
