= Teddy Glover =

American soccer player

Personal information
- Full name: Charles Edward Glover
- Date of birth: 7 April 1902
- Place of birth: Bootle, Liverpool, England
- Date of death: 8 February 1993 (aged 90)
- Place of death: Pueblo, Colorado, United States
- Height: 5 ft 7 in (1.70 m)
- Position: Full back

Youth career
- Byker West End

Senior career*
| Years | Team | Apps | (Gls) |
| 1922–1925 | New Brighton | 32 | (?) |
| 1925–1927 | Southport | 55 | (?) |
| 1927–1928 | Wigan Borough | 12 | (?) |
| 1928–1930 | New York Giants | 75 | (0) |
| 1930 | → New York Soccer Club | 27 | (1) |
| 1931–1932 | New York Giants | 34 | (0) |
| 1932–1934 | New York Americans | | |
| 1934–1940 | Brookhattan | | |
- Pfaelzer
- Brooklyn S.C.
- * Club domestic league appearances and goals

Charles Edward "Teddy" Glover (7 April 1902 – 8 February 1993) was a US soccer full back who began his career in the lower English divisions before playing several seasons in the American Soccer League. He is a member of the National Soccer Hall of Fame.

In August 1922, Glover began his professional career with New Brighton A.F.C. of the English Third Division North. On 14 July 1925, he moved to Southport for two seasons. On 5 August 1927, he was transferred to Wigan Borough F.C. In 1928, he moved to the United States where he signed with the New York Giants of the Eastern Soccer League. The Giants moved to the American Soccer League in 1930, playing as the New York Soccer Club. In the spring of 1931, Glover moved to the New York Giants. However, this was a different team than the previous Giants. When the first Giants renamed themselves the New York Soccer Club, the owner of the New York Nationals decided to rename the Nationals the Giants. In the spring of 1931, the Giants won the ASL championship. The Giants folded after the spring 1932 season and Glover moved to the New York Americans. The first ASL collapsed in the summer of 1933, to be replaced by the second ASL. The Americans moved to the new league. In 1934, Glover joined Brookhattan of the ASL, remaining with them until 1940. He then finished out his career with Pfaelzer S.C. of the German American Soccer League and Brooklyn S.C.

Glover was inducted into the National Soccer Hall of Fame in 1951.

Teddy also served as an assistant coach at the University of Southern Colorado (now CSU-Pueblo) in 1991 and 1992.
