= Joseph Delach =

American soccer player, coach, executive, and league president

Personal information
- Date of birth: November 9, 1910
- Place of birth: Beadling, Pennsylvania, United States
- Date of death: July 31, 1975 (aged 64)
- Place of death: United States
- Height: 5 ft 8 in (1.73 m)
- Position: Right half

Senior career*
Years	Team	Apps	(Gls)
1935–1946	Pittsburgh Beadling		

Managerial career
- Pittsburgh Beadling
- * Club domestic league appearances and goals

Joseph Delach was an American soccer right half, coach, team executive and league president who spent his entire professional career with Pittsburgh Beadling. He is a member of the National Soccer Hall of Fame.

Delach played for Pittsburgh Beadling from 1935 until his retirement as a player in 1946. He also coached the team into the early 1960s. He served as President of the Keystone League from 1962 to 1983 and was commissioner of the National Amateur Cup for ten years.

Delach is a member of the Beadling Hall of Fame and was inducted into the National Soccer Hall of Fame in 1973.
