= Philip Slone =

American soccer player

Phil Slone
Personal information
- Full name: Philip Slone
- Date of birth: January 20, 1907
- Place of birth: New York City, New York, U.S.
- Date of death: November 4, 2003 (aged 96)
- Place of death: West Palm Beach, Florida, U.S.

Senior career*
Years	Team	Apps	(Gls)
1928–1929	New York Hakoah		
1929–1930	New York Giants	27	(0)
1930–1931	Hakoah All-Stars	62	(1)
1933–1940	New York Brookhattan		

International career
1930	United States	1	(0)
Medal record
Men's soccer
Representing United States
FIFA World Cup
Third place	1930 Uruguay
- * Club domestic league appearances and goals

Philip Slone (January 20, 1907 – November 4, 2003) was an American soccer midfielder. He spent ten years in the American Soccer League and was a member of the United States national team at the 1930 FIFA World Cup. He is also a member of the National Soccer Hall of Fame.

== Youth ==
Slone grew up in New York City and attended Manhattan's High School of Commerce. He was a multi-sport athlete, earning varsity letters in baseball, basketball and soccer. After high school, he attended St. John's University. He graduated in 1929 with a degree in law.

== Club career ==
While in high school, SC Hakoah Wien a powerhouse Austrian team toured the U.S. During that tour, members of the team saw Slone playing and when they moved to the U.S. in 1928 to form a team in the Eastern Soccer League (ESL), they invited Slone, then in college to play with them. Slone signed with New York Hakoah of the ESL in 1928, beginning his twelve-year professional career. That first season was difficult. As he remembers it, "Life was hectic then. I played professional soccer on the weekends, worked during the week and went to evening classes at St. John's University Law School."

A little background is required to understand the next two years of Slone's career. The ESL was created during the “Soccer War” which pitted the American Soccer League and the USFA. After three ASL teams were expelled from the league, they joined several other teams to form the ESL. This league lasted a season and a half before merging with the ASL at the end of the “Soccer War”. New York Hakoah was owned by Maurice Vandeweghe, who also owned the New York Giants of the ASL. The merger of the ESL and ASL meant that Vandeweghe now owned to teams in the same league. League rules forbid that, so Vandeweghe sold Hakoah. When he did, Slone jumped to Vandeweghe's other team, the Giants.

In June 1930, Slone left the U.S. to play in the 1930 FIFA World Cup. He and his teammates returned to discover the ASL had experienced a reshuffling of teams in their absence. As a result, Slone left the Giants, now named the Nationals, to sign with the Hakoah All-Stars which had been formed by the merger of his old team, New York Hakoah of the ESL and Brooklyn Hakoah of the ASL. The All Stars played until 1932 when they folded at the end of the season. Slone then moved to New York Brookhattan. The ASL folded in 1933 but was immediately replaced by a second American Soccer League. Slone continued to play with Brookhattan in the second ASL until his retirement in 1940.

== National team ==
Slone earned one cap for the United States in 1930 when he traveled to Uruguay for the 1930 FIFA World Cup. However, his cap did not come during the finals, but in an August 17, 1930 loss to Brazil following the cup.

Slone was inducted into the National Soccer Hall of Fame in 1986. He died in West Palm Beach, Florida in 2003. At the time of his death, he was the last surviving member of the inaugural U.S. World Cup team.
