= Robert Annis =

American soccer player

Bob Annis

Personal information
- Full name: Robert Joseph Annis
- Date of birth: September 5, 1928
- Place of birth: St. Louis, Missouri, United States
- Date of death: March 31, 1995 (aged 66)
- Place of death: St. Louis, Missouri, United States
- Position: Defender

Senior career*
| Years | Team | Apps | (Gls) |
| 1947–1950 | St. Louis Simpkins-Ford | | |

International career
| 1948 | United States | 1 | (0) |
- * Club domestic league appearances and goals

Robert “Bob” Joseph Annis (September 5, 1928 – March 31, 1995) was an American soccer defender. He was a member of both the 1948 United States Olympic soccer team and the U.S. team at the 1950 FIFA World Cup. He is a member of the National Soccer Hall of Fame.

== Simpkins-Ford ==
Annis was a member of the St. Louis Simpkins-Ford club from at least 1948 to 1950. During that time, Simpkins was a dominant team, winning both the 1948 and 1950 National Challenge Cup championships.

== National and Olympic Teams ==
Annis was selected for the American squad at the 1948 Summer Olympics. However, he did not play in the only U.S. game of the tournament, a 9–0 loss to Italy.

Later that summer, he earned his only cap with the national team, a 3–1 win over Israel on September 26, 1948. In 1950, Annis was part of the U.S. team at the 1950 FIFA World Cup, but never entered a game as the U.S. went 1–2 in the first round. Annis was inducted into the National Soccer Hall of Fame in 1995, along with the rest of the 1950 U.S. World Cup squad.

== Personal Information ==
Born in Saint Louis, Annis was the son of Frank and Katherine Annis. He was married to Lena M. Annis (née Montani). He died on March 31, 1995, in Saint Louis, and is buried in Resurrection Cemetery in Affton, Missouri.
