= Joseph Gryzik =

Polish-born American soccer player (1927–2019)

Personal information
- Date of birth: October 10, 1927
- Place of birth: Katowice, Poland
- Date of death: April 23, 2019 (aged 91)
- Position: Halfback

Senior career*
Years	Team	Apps	(Gls)
1949–1965	A.A.C. Eagles		
- * Club domestic league appearances and goals

Joseph Gryzik (October 10, 1927 – 23 April 2019) was a U.S. soccer halfback who spent his entire career with the Chicago Eagles of the National Soccer League of Chicago. He is a member of the National Soccer Hall of Fame.

Gryzik emigrated to the United States in 1949, settling in Chicago, Illinois. When he arrived, he joined the Polish American Athletic Club of the National Soccer League of Chicago. In 1950, the team was renamed the Chicago Eagles. Gryzik and his teammates won five Peel Cup titles (1950, 1954, 1955, 1957 and 1963). Gryzik holds the Peel Cup single game scoring record with eight goals. In 1955, the Eagles went to the National Amateur Cup finals where they fell to the Pittsburgh Heidelberg Tornados. Gryzik retired in 1965, having spent his entire career with the Eagles, after suffering a career-ending injury.

Gryzik was a member of the U.S. soccer team at the 1963 Pan American Games. He was also selected to the U.S. team that did not qualify for the 1964 Summer Olympics.
