= Robert Craddock =

American soccer player (1923–2003)

Bob Craddock
Personal information
- Full name: Robert W. Craddock
- Date of birth: September 5, 1923
- Place of birth: Lawrenceville, Pittsburgh, Pennsylvania, United States
- Date of death: March 28, 2003 (aged 79)
- Place of death: Myrtle Beach, South Carolina, United States
- Position: Forward

Senior career*
Years	Team	Apps	(Gls)
- Castle Shannon
- Harmarville Hurricanes

International career
1954	United States	1	(0)
- * Club domestic league appearances and goals

Robert "Bob" W. Craddock (September 5, 1923 – March 28, 2003) was an American soccer player who was a member of the U.S. team at the 1950 FIFA World Cup. He earned one cap in 1954.

== Club career ==
Craddock spent his playing career in Pennsylvania with two teams, Castle Shannon and Harmarville. He was with Harmarville when selected for the 1950 FIFA World Cup. Harmarville lost both the 1950 and 1952 National Amateur Cup and the 1954 and 1956 National Challenge Cups.

== National team ==
While Craddock was selected to the U.S. roster for the 1950 FIFA World Cup, he earned his only cap with the national team in a 3–0 win over Haiti on April 4, 1954.

Craddock was inducted into the National Soccer Hall of Fame in 1997. His father Robert B. Craddock is also a member of the Hall of Fame.
