= Al Harker =

American soccer player

Personal information
- Full name: Albert Harker
- Date of birth: April 11, 1910
- Place of birth: Philadelphia, Pennsylvania, United States
- Date of death: April 3, 2006 (aged 95)
- Place of death: Camp Hill, Pennsylvania, United States
- Positions: Half back; full back

Youth career
- 1926–1929: Girard College

Senior career*
Years	Team	Apps	(Gls)
1929–1930	Corinthians		
1930–1931	Upper Darby		
1931–1932	Kensington Blue Bells		
1932–1941	Philadelphia German-Americans		
1941–	→ Philadelphia Americans		
- * Club domestic league appearances and goals

Albert Harker (April 11, 1910 – April 3, 2006) was a U.S. soccer player who was a member of the U.S. team at the 1934 FIFA World Cup. During his Hall of Fame career, he won three American Soccer League championships, two league cups, a National Amateur Cup title and the 1935 National Challenge Cup.

== Youth and college ==
Harker attended Girard College where he played on the men's soccer team from 1926 to 1929.

== Professional ==
Following his graduation from Girard, he signed with Corinthians of the National Soccer League of Philadelphia. In 1930, he moved to Upper Darby and in 1931 to the Kensington Blue Bells. In 1932, he moved to the Philadelphia German-Americans. When the second American Soccer League formed in 1933, the German-Americans moved to the new league. That year, the team won the National Amateur Cup and the National Challenge Cup in 1935. The team became known as the Philadelphia Americans in 1941. Under its new name, Harker and his teammates won the ASL championship in 1942, 1944 and 1947, as well as the league cup in 1941 and 1943.

== National team ==
Harker was called into the for the 1934 FIFA World Cup, but did not see time in the lone U.S. game of the cup, a 7–1 loss to eventual champion Italy. He was also called into the U.S. Olympic soccer team for the 1936 Summer Olympics, but declined because he was unable to take two months off work.

He was inducted into the National Soccer Hall of Fame in 1979 and the Girard College Athletic Hall of Fame in 2006.

== Personal ==
Harker died on April 8, 2006, at a nursing home in Camp Hill, Pennsylvania, eight days before his 96th birthday. He was the last surviving member of the 1934 World Cup squad. Even in his later years Al would sit with his great-granddaughter and recall the days of playing with his teammates. He would recall how they would come over to the house during the summer and pick up a game of volleyball in the backyard. Al always held those fond memories of soccer close to his heart. Seventy-three years later, he still wore his National Amateur Cup ring.
