= Nicolaas Steelink =

American labor activist (1890–1989)

- Born: October 5, 1890; Amsterdam, Netherlands
- Died: April 21, 1989 (aged 98); Tucson, Arizona, U.S.
- Occupations: Soccer player, Labor activist
- Known for: IWW Member, United States Soccer Hall of Fame Inductee

Nicolaas Steelink (October 5, 1890 – April 21, 1989) was a Dutch American labor activist who was a member of the Industrial Workers of the World (IWW), an international industrial union, and an important figure in the creation of the California Soccer League, which resulted in his induction into the United States Soccer Hall of Fame. During his time as a member of the IWW, due to his involvement with the union and radical ideals, he was convicted of criminal syndicalism and sentenced to prison in 1920.

== Early life ==
Steelink was born in Amsterdam, the Netherlands, the son of a grocer. Throughout most of his childhood, Steelink enjoyed spending his days playing soccer. In 1908, at the age of 18 he started working at the Dutch Steamship Company, a company formed in 1885 that ran as a steamship service from Amsterdam to London, and also played soccer as a member of the works team. At the age of 22, he immigrated from the Netherlands to the United States. Once he arrived in the United States, he settled down in Seattle, Washington.

== Activism and arrest ==
After living in Seattle for two years, Steelink decided to move to Los Angeles in 1914. While in Los Angeles, he began to be exposed to certain political aspects due to the men whom he played soccer with. Through the relationships he garnered from playing, he learned about the different types of political activist that existed in California in the early part of the 20th century. This exposure to the different types of political activism began to mold Steelink into a radical. After learning of the different radical movements that existed, and through many aspects of the United States government which he did not agree with, such as censorship, poor working conditions, war propaganda, and lynchings, Steelink decided to become a member of the Industrial Workers of the World (IWW) and served as a typist for the union. As a member of the IWW, he wrote a weekly column for the Industrial Worker, a paper belonging to the IWW, under the pseudonym of Ennaes Ellae. At the end of World War I, many states passed laws in order to contain the growing radicalism among workers, which led to California passing the Criminal Syndicalism Act in 1919, in an effort to make sure that trade unions did not take over manufacturing plants. Once the law was passed, Steelink, due to his major involvement with the IWW, and 151 other members of the Industrial Workers of the World, were tried on charges of criminal syndicalism, convicted and sentenced to prison. Steelink was sentenced to five years hard labor in San Quentin Prison in California. After serving two years of his jail sentence, Steelink was granted his parole in 1922, but his experience in jail further strengthened his beliefs in making sure that workers were treated fairly. After his release, Steelink felt that society was not accepting of him for being a convicted criminal. He even discussed this with Eleanor Roosevelt, and did not agree with the fact that even though some of the IWW members were being pardoned for their crimes, the government in California did not see their errors in arresting the members of the IWW. From his experiences in prison, Steelink wrote a number of memoirs discussing the different experiences that he went through during his time in San Quentin.

== Later life ==
After his release from prison, Steelink continued to be involved with the IWW, constantly writing articles for the IWW entitled "Musings of a Wobbly", and still trying to fight against work place injustice. As he got older, Steelink began to become less involved with the IWW, but began to contribute more to soccer. He began to dedicate more time to soccer, coaching many youth players and became a very important figure in the creation of the California Soccer League in 1958. Through this involvement he was inducted to the United States Soccer Hall of Fame in 1971. In 1965, Steelink retired from his job in accounting, and moved to Tucson, Arizona. Steelink lived in Tucson until his death in 1989 at the age of 98.

== Sources ==
- Kuhn, Gabriel (2011). Soccer Vs. the State: Tackling Football and Politics. PM Press. pp. 26–27. ISBN 9781604860535.
- Lovell, George (2012). This Is Not Civil Rights: Discovering Rights Talk in 1939 America. University of Chicago Press. p. 171. ISBN 9780226494043.
- "Hall of Famers". US Soccer.
- 'Reis in Droomland'. Boek geschreven door Nicolaas (Nico) Steelink zelf. Uitgever: Baalprodukties, Sittard. Oktober 1998. ISBN 90-75825-11-0
