= George Barr (soccer) =

Scottish-born American soccer player

Personal information
- Date of birth: December 31, 1915
- Place of birth: Edinburgh, Scotland, United Kingdom
- Date of death: April 11, 2000 (aged 84)
- Place of death: Syosset, New York, United States
- Position: Fullback

Senior career*
Years	Team	Apps	(Gls)
1933–1935	Brooklyn Celtic		
1935–1941, 1945–1947	New York Brookhattan		
1947–1950	Brooklyn Hispano		
- * Club domestic league appearances and goals

George Barr (December 31, 1915 – April 11, 2000) was an American soccer fullback who spent fifteen seasons in the American Soccer League. He was inducted to the National Soccer Hall of Fame in 1983.

Barr moved to the United States from England in 1927. Five years later, he signed with Brooklyn Celtic of the American Soccer League. In 1935, he moved to New York Brookhattan. In 1936, he had a trial with Hearts F.C., but was not offered a contract. He returned to Brookhattan and remained with the team until 1947, except for three years during which he served in the U.S. Army during World War II. While Brookhattan won the 1945 National Challenge Cup, Barr was injured and did not play in the final. In 1947, Barr joined Brooklyn Hispano, retiring in 1950. During all of this time George played against numerous touring teams both for his club and for ASL All Star teams. Most notable amongst these were the games in 1939 for the Eastern United States and the ASL All Star teams which opposed the touring Scottish Football Association team. In 1941 George played in the first two indoor tournaments held in the old Madison Square Garden since the late 1920s. The first event was a debacle as the terrazzo surface proved to be so slippery for the fast game, but for the second tournament packed dirt was substituted and the games were well received by the 12,000 fans. During the years of the Second World War he was shipped off to the Southwest Pacific Theatre of Operations where he eventually captained the U. S. Army team during World War II in games played in Brisbane and Sydney, Australia. Off the soccer field he worked for J.C. Penney for 39 years. After retirement, coached the Syosset Police Boys Club in the Long Island Junior League.
