= Peter Wilson (American soccer) =

Scottish-American soccer player

Peter Wilson was a Scottish-American football defender who played professionally in Scotland and the United States. He is a member of the National Soccer Hall of Fame.

He played for St Johnstone in the Scottish Football League during the 1896–1897 season. He then moved to the United States where he remained for the rest of his life. He played for the Kearny Scottish-Americans – possibly in the National Association Football League; Paterson Rangers, a team in Pawtucket – possibly the Pawtucket Rangers; and the Philadelphia Hibernian. Dates and leagues are unknown.

A P. Wilson is listed as a left back with Tacony Field Club in 1910.

Wilson was inducted into the National Soccer Hall of Fame in 1950.
