= Sheldon Govier =

American soccer player

Personal information
- Full name: Sheldon Benjamin Govier
- Date of birth: 11 January 1876
- Date of death: 20 May 1951 (aged 75)
- Place of death: Chicago, Illinois, United States
- Position: Center half

Youth career
- Hallside Athletics

Senior career*
Years	Team	Apps	(Gls)
1891–????	Pullman		
1896	Thistles		
1896–1897	St. Louis Cycling Club		
1901	Chicago		
- Pullman
- Wanderers
- Woodlawn
- Buxton Red Sox
–1917	Pullman		
1917–1918	Joliet F.C.		
- * Club domestic league appearances and goals

Sheldon Benjamin Govier (11 January 1876 – 20 May 1951) was an American soccer player who was a center halfback. He spent his entire career in the United States, primarily with Pullman F.C. He is a member of the National Soccer Hall of Fame.

== Youth ==
Govier was born in Scotland to English parents. They moved to Newton, Cambuslang, when he was three and he played schoolboy football at Hallside Primary. His parents left Britain in 1891 and settled the family in Chicago, Illinois. His father died within months of their arrival in Chicago and Govier, fifteen years old at the time, went to work for the Pullman Company. He eventually played for the company team, Pullman F.C. His younger brother, Sheldon William, was eight when they arrived in Chicago. Sheldon W. later both worked and played for Pullman, but became better known for his involvement in Chicago politics. Biographies of the two men frequently intermix their biographical details.

== Career ==
When Govier began playing for Pullman, it competed in the Chicago League of Association Football. He gained his first start with the team when he was fifteen. He then moved to Thistles. In December 1896, Govier moved to the St. Louis Cycling Club of the St. Louis Football Association. As late as 1900, Govier would play for Cycling Club if called upon. In 1901, Govier briefly played for Chicago in a four team league created by baseball owners. The league lasted a few games before collapsing. In 1905, he was captain of the Chicago All Star team which defeated the touring Pilgrim's team. He played one season each for Wanderers, Woodlawn and Buxton Red Sox before rejoining Pullman. In 1917, Pullman disbanded and Govier moved to Joliet F.C. before retiring in 1918. He was inducted into the National Soccer Hall of Fame in 1950. His son, Benjamin Govier Jr., also played in the Chicago leagues.
