= St. Louis Simpkins-Ford =

American amateur soccer team

St. Louis Simpkins-Ford (also known as Simpkins) was a U.S. amateur soccer team based in St. Louis, Missouri from 1947 to 1956. It won three league championships and the 1948 and 1950 National Challenge Cups, and lost in the finals of the 1954 National Amateur Cup. Five members of the U.S. team at the 1950 FIFA World Cup came from Simpkins.

== Origin ==
In 1947, a St. Louis amateur soccer team sponsored by Carrenti Cleaners changed sponsorship to the Joe Simpkins Ford Auto dealership. Renamed St. Louis Simpkins-Ford, the team entered the new St. Louis Major League in 1948. The team revamped its roster, bringing in several top St. Louis players. Five of them, Robert Annis, Gino Pariani, Charlie Colombo, Frank Borghi and Frank Wallace, were on the U.S. team which competed at the 1950 World Cup.

== Year by Year ==
=== 1947-1948 ===
Despite its outstanding roster, Simpkins struggled in its first season in the St. Louis Major League. The League featured only four teams, De Andreis, St. Louis Raiders, Steamfitters and Simpkins. Simpkins finished third with eleven points and a 4–5–3 record. While it struggled in league play, it dominated the National Challenge Cup winning the title with a 3–2 victory over the professional New York Brookhattan of the American Soccer League (ASL).

=== 1948-1949 ===
In 1949, Simpkins improved on its finish the previous season when it ended in second place. This year the team placed three players on the national team at the 1949 NAFC Championship.

=== 1949-1950 ===
In 1950, Simpkins took both the league title and the National Challenge Cup. While most National Cups have been decided in a single game, this year the organizers opted for a home and away series. On April 22, 1950, Simpkins defeated Fall River Ponta Delgada 2–0. The second leg, held on May 7, 1950, ended in a 1–1 tie with Simpkins taking the title on aggregate. It was this year that Simpkins contributed five of its players to the U.S. team at the 1950 FIFA World Cup. In that tournament, the U.S. went 1–2, but its victory was the greatest upset of World Cup history as the U.S. defeated heavy favorites England.

=== 1950-1951 ===
Simpkins success of 1949-1950 did not continue into the 1950–1951 season. While the team began strong, it ended up second behind Zenthoefer Furs in the standings.

=== 1951-1952 ===
Simpkins again finished second in the league, this time to St. Louis Raiders.

=== 1952-1953 ===
While Simpkins was beginning to fade, finishing third in the league, it won the St. Louis Major League's first post season round-robin by defeating Kutis 3–1. Despite the addition of a post-season, the St. Louis Major League folded at the end of the season when their stadium was sold. Simpkins and Kutis moved to the Municipal League, essentially a second division league, for the 1954 season.

=== 1954 ===
As a lower division league, the Municipal League fielded several more teams, divided into a North and South Division, than the old St. Louis Major League. Simpkins showed its strength by taking the South Division. Simpkins also went to the finals of the National Amateur Cup only to fall to Pittsburgh Beadling 7–6 on aggregate. While Simpkins had just joined the Municipal League, mismanagement by the league's front office convinced the team to leave the league and join with several other ex-Municipal League teams to form a competing league, known as the Khoury League as it was formed by George Khoury.

=== 1955 ===
Simpkins won the first year of the Khoury League with a perfect 13-0-0 record. Frank Borghi was selected as the league MVP. Simpkins also went to the semifinals of the National Challenge Cup before falling to Los Angeles Danes.

=== 1956 ===
In 1956 Simpkins again won the Khoury League.

== Record ==
Year	Record	League	Amateur Cup	National Cup
1947-1948	4-5-3	3rd		Champion
1948-1949	10-6-6	2nd		Withdrew
1949-1950		Champion		Champion
1950-1951	10-9-4	2nd		
1951-1952	12-6-4	2nd		
1952-1953	6-8-2	3rd		
1954	11-0-1	1st – South Division	Final	
1955	13-0-0	Champion		Semifinals
1956		Champion		

== Coaches ==
- Joe Numi 1950
