= Elmer Schroeder =

Elmer Andrew Schroeder (25 February 1898 – 19 September 1953) was an American lawyer, soccer executive and manager. He was president of the United States Football Association between 1934 and 1953, the first American-born to exercise this function.

He was born in Philadelphia, as son of German immigrants. After finishing the high school in Northeast High School, he attended to the University of Pennsylvania where he earned an undergraduate degree and then received a law degree. He started working in soccer while he was studying in the UPenn with the Lighthouse Boys Club, which he eventually lead. After this experience he started to develop a career managing soccer and organizing tournaments in Pennsylvania. This experience make him to rose charges in the then United States Soccer Federation. Schroeder was designated manager of the United States soccer teams at the 1928 Olympic Games, the 1934 FIFA World Cup and the 1936 Olympic Games.

Schroeder was gay. He was killed in his apartment in Philadelphia after leaving a gay club around midnight on 19 September 1953 with an undentified male. Basil Kingsley Beck was accused of the crime and placed in the FBI's Ten Most Wanted Fugitives, captured and then released for lack of evidence. Despite various suspects, the culprit was never found.

He was added to the National Soccer Hall of Fame in 1951.
