= Robert Contiguglia =

American soccer executive (born 1941)

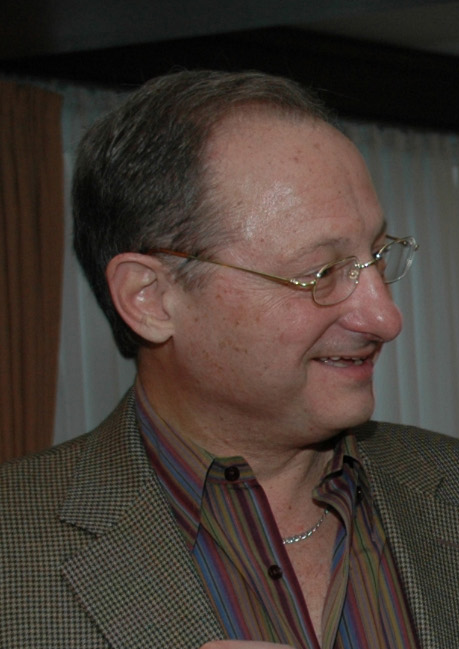
Contiguglia in 2006

S. Robert "Bob" Contiguglia (born September 14, 1941) served as President of the United States Soccer Federation from 1998 to 2006. Among his achievements as President of U.S. Soccer were: successfully hosting the 1999 Women's World Cup, convincing FIFA to relocate the 2003 Women's World Cup to the United States after the original plans to host it in China fell through, the U.S. women's team winning gold at the 2004 Summer Olympics, and hiring Bruce Arena as coach for the United States men's national team. In May 2018, Contiguglia was selected to the National Soccer Hall of Fame.

== Early life and education ==
Contiguglia was born in New York City and raised on Long Island. He later became a resident of Colorado. He earned an undergraduate degree at Columbia University, majoring in zoology with a minor in English. He earned a medical degree at the SUNY Health Science Center at Brooklyn, and became a nephrologist.

== Career ==
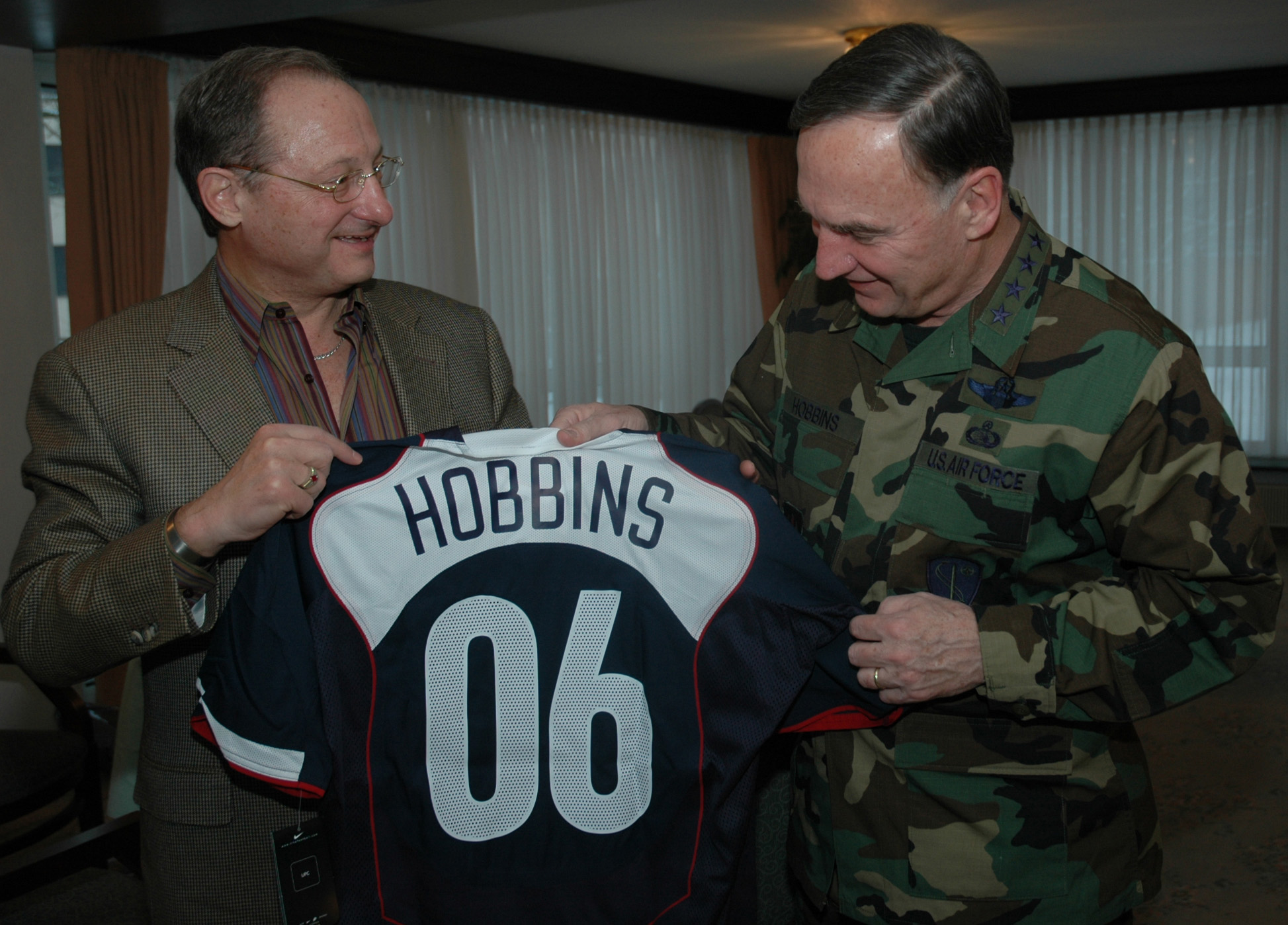
Contiguglia (left), presents Gen. Tom Hobbins with a U.S. men's national team jersey at the Ramstein Air Base in Germany in 2006.

Contiguglia has played, coached, and managed soccer at several different levels. He previously ran for President of U.S. Soccer in 1984, but lost to Werner Fricker. He served as President of U.S. Youth Soccer from 1990 to 1996.
