= Werner Mieth =

German-American soccer player

Personal information
- Date of birth: April 28, 1912
- Place of birth: Meissen, Germany
- Date of death: August 28, 1997 (aged 85)
- Place of death: Union, New Jersey, United States
- Height: 5 ft 10 in (1.78 m)
- Position: Halfback

Senior career*
Years	Team	Apps	(Gls)
- Coswig
1925–1935	Newark Germans		
1935–1937	McDonough		
1937–1938	Kearny Irish		
1938–1939	Trenton Highlanders		
1939–1940	Paterson Dovers		
1940–1941	Philadelphia German-Americans		
1941–1953	→ Philadelphia Americans		
1953–1954	→ Uhrik Truckers		
1954–1962	Elizabeth Falcons		
1962–	Newark Germans		
- * Club domestic league appearances and goals

Werner Mieth (April 28, 1912 – September 28, 1997) was a German-American football (soccer) halfback. He is a member of the National Soccer Hall of Fame. He spent most of his career in the American Soccer League and the German American Soccer League.

Mieth began his career in Germany as a junior player with Coswig. In 1925, he moved to the United States where he joined the junior team of the Newark Germans which competed in the German American Soccer League. He eventually found a place with the Americans’ first team as it won the 1931, 1932 and 1932 GASL titles. In 1933, Newark joined the American Soccer League. Mieth moved to McDonough S.C. in 1935 and to the Kearny Irish in 1937. He remained there for only one season before switching to the Trenton Highlanders for the 1938–1939 season and the Paterson Dovers for the 1939–1940 season. In 1940, Mieth joined the Philadelphia German-Americans where he spent the next twelve seasons. The German-Americans were renamed the Americans in 1941, winning the ASL championship in 1942, 1944, 1947, 1948 and 1952. In 1953, Uhrick Trucking purchased the team, renaming the team the Uhrik Truckers. In 1954, Truckers released Mieth and he moved to the Elizabeth Falcons. In 1962, he moved to the Westfield Lions which played in the Italian League. At some point, he returned to the Newark Germans.
