= Alex Weir (soccer) =

Scottish-American soccer player

Personal information
- Place of birth: Scotland
- Place of death: United States
- Position: Defender

Senior career*
| Years | Team | Apps | (Gls) |
- Brooklyn St. Mary's Celtic
- New York Americans
- Brooklyn Wanderers
- Brookhattan
- * Club domestic league appearances and goals

Alex Weir was a Scottish-American soccer defender who played in the second American Soccer League from 1936 to 1949. He is a member of the National Soccer Hall of Fame.

Weir moved to the United States when he was nineteen and spent thirteen seasons in the American Soccer League. Weir was the captain of St. Mary's Celtic when it finished runner-up to Chicago Sparta in the 1938 National Challenge Cup. In 1944, he played for the Brooklyn Wanderers. In 1975, he was inducted into the National Soccer Hall of Fame.
