= Peter Peel (soccer coach) =

American soccer coach and promoter

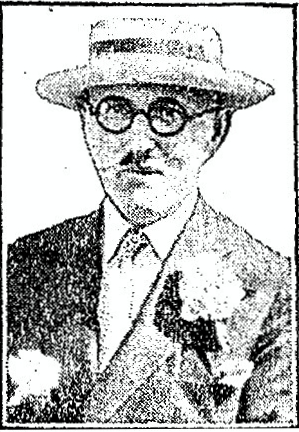
- Chicago Daily Tribune photo of Peter Peel from the May 25, 1923

3rd & 5th President of United States Soccer Federation
- In office 1917–1919
- Preceded by: John Fernley
- Succeeded by: George Healey
- In office 1923–1924
- Preceded by: George Healey
- Succeeded by: Morris W. Johnson

Personal details
- Born: Peter J. Peel; 1866 Dublin, Ireland
- Died: May 3, 1960 (aged 94) Chicago, Illinois, U.S.

Peter J. Peel (1866 – May 3, 1960) was a two-time president of the United States Football Association. He also coached the U.S. Olympic team at the 1924 Summer Olympics and founded the Peel Cup. He was elected as a builder to the U.S. National Soccer Hall of Fame in 1951.

Peel was born in Dublin, Ireland and grew up in Ireland, but in 1893 traveled to the United States to visit the Chicago World’s Fair. He remained in Chicago.

Peel became an integral part of Chicago's athletic scene. In 1909, he established the Peel Cup, an annual cup competition to crown the Illinois state champion. Peel intended this cup to have two purposes, one was to promote a high level of competition and also to raise money for a player benefit fund. The Peel Cup the longest running U.S. soccer cup until superseded in 1970 by the Illinois Governor’s Cup. Three years later, he established the Peel Shield which was awarded to the Cook County, Illinois high school championship. In 1916, the Illinois State Soccer Football Association was formed, and Peter Peel was elected its first president.

== U.S. Soccer ==
A year later, he was elected as the president of the United States Football Association. At the time, the term of office was limited to one year. Peel was re-elected in 1918 for a second term. Peel was elected for a third time in 1923, narrowly defeating Thomas Cahill. In one of the more odd incidents in U.S. soccer administrative history, Peel terminated Cahill, who was the association’s first vice president, accusing Cahill of attacking him with a knife. According to Cahill, he was using a knife to peel a plug of tobacco when Peel became aggressive toward him. During this term in office, Peel oversaw the entry of the first official U.S. team to enter the Olympics. In 1924, Peel chose not to stand for re-election and declared bankruptcy soon after. However, he remained active in soccer affairs, primarily in Chicago, but also to a limited extent on the national level until his death in Chicago.
