= Kurt Lamm =

German-born American soccer player and administrator

- Born: March 10, 1919; Salmünster, Germany
- Died: July 1, 1987 (aged 68)
- Employer: American Soccer League
- Known for: Soccer player, coach, manager, administrator
- Children: 3

Kurt Lamm (March 10, 1919 – July 1, 1987) was a German-born American soccer player, coach, manager, and administrator.

== Early and family life ==
Lamm was Jewish, and was born in Salmünster, Germany. He came to the United States in 1936, at the age of 17. He was married to Doris Lamm, and had three children.

== Soccer career ==
Lamm served as a soccer player, coach, and manager in the American Soccer League for 43 years.

=== Player ===
Lamm began playing soccer as a goalkeeper, but was primarily a fullback-forward for 29 years (20 years as an amateur) with Fussball Club Schmalnau (Rhoen) and F.C. Borussia Fulda in Germany, and Prospect Unity, New York Americans, S.C. Eintracht, and F.C. Hakoah in the United States. His Eintracht team of the German-American Soccer League won the 1944 National Amateur Cup Championship.

=== Coach and manager ===
During his 14 years as a coach, Lamm's New York Hakoah team won three successive American Soccer League Championships, from 1955 to 1958. He was named ASL's Manager of the Year for the 1957–58 and 1962–63 seasons.

=== Administrator ===
He served as the ASL's administrative director, vice president, and president from 1962 to 1967. He was general secretary of the United States Soccer Federation from 1971 to 1987.

=== Honors ===
Lamm was inducted into the U.S. National Soccer Federation Hall of Fame in 1979. He was inducted into the Confederation of North, Central American and Caribbean Association Football Hall of Fame in 1994, and the United States Adult Soccer Association Hall of Fame in 1999.

He also received the Pillar of Achievement Award from the International Jewish Sports Hall of Fame.

The USASA Men's Amateur Cup is named in his honor.
