= Robert Morrison (soccer) =

Scottish-American soccer player

Robert Morrison (25 April 1883 – 4 June 1952) was a Scottish American soccer half back who played most of his career in the United States.

Born in Glasgow and raised in the city's Bridgeton district, Morrison was a prominent player in the Scottish Junior leagues. In 1909 he moved to the United States where he joined Disston A.A. of the Philadelphia State League. Morrison and his teammates won the 1911 and 1912 league titles. Disston also went to the semifinals of the 1911 American Cup. In April 1913, Disston went to the finals of the American Cup where it fell in three games to the Paterson True Blues. That fall, Morrison moved to Bethlehem Steel of the Allied American Football Association. His first game with Bethlehem took place on November 13, 1913, a 10–0 victory over the Irish-Americans. Bethlehem Steel won the 1913–14 and 1914–15 league titles and the 1915 and 1916 National Challenge Cups. He began the 1916–17 season as team captain, but within a month rarely appeared in the lineup. According to the National Soccer Hall of Fame, he suffered a career-ending injury in 1918. He was inducted into the National Soccer Hall of Fame in 1951.

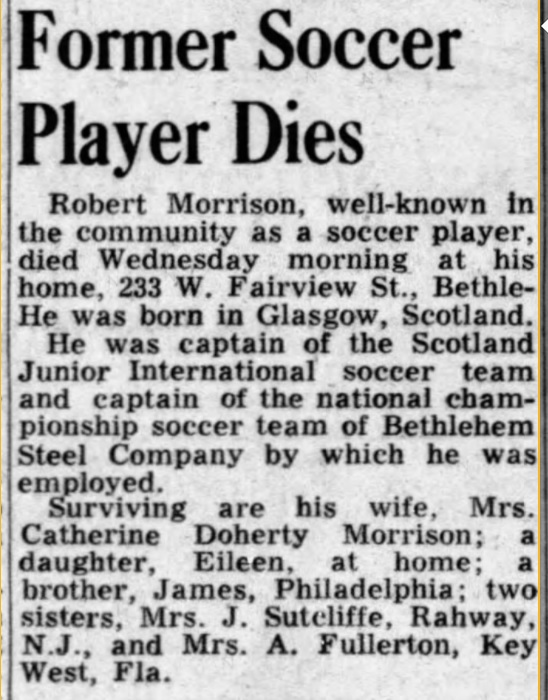
Obituary of Robert Morrison in the Allentown Morning Call, 05 June 1952.

Morrison's younger brother, Joe Morrison, played a few games with Bethlehem Steel as well as twenty-three games with Fleisher Yarn during the 1924–25 American Soccer League season.
