= Frank Vaughn =

American soccer player

Frank Vaughan
Personal information
- Full name: Frank J. Vaughan
- Date of birth: February 18, 1902
- Place of birth: St. Louis, Missouri, U.S.
- Date of death: July 9, 1959 (aged 57)
- Place of death: St. Louis, Missouri, U.S.
- Height: 5 ft 9 3/4 in (1.77 m)
- Position: Full back

Senior career*
Years	Team	Apps	(Gls)
- Ben Millers
Medal record
Men's soccer
Representing United States
FIFA World Cup
Third place	1930 Uruguay
- * Club domestic league appearances and goals

Frank J. "Frankie" Vaughan (also spelled Vaughn) (February 18, 1902 – July 9, 1959) was an American soccer full back. He spent his entire career in St. Louis with the Ben Millers and was on the United States national team roster in the 1930 FIFA World Cup. He is a member of the National Soccer Hall of Fame.

== Professional career ==
Vaughan was born in St. Louis and spent his professional career with the Ben Millers in the St. Louis Soccer League during the 1920s and 1930s. However, he is not listed on the team's roster for either its 1920 National Challenge Cup championship or when it finished as runner-up in the 1926 edition. In 1920, he was part of a St. Louis All Star team which toured Scandinavia.

== National team ==
In 1930, Vaughan was called into the United States national team for the 1930 FIFA World Cup. While he did not play in any of the tournament's games, he did play in several exhibition matches during the U.S. team's tour of South America following its elimination. These games were against domestic league teams and did not count as full international caps. As a result, Vaughan never officially played for the United States.

Vaughan died in his home city of St. Louis and was inducted into the St. Louis Soccer Hall of Fame in 1972 and the National Soccer Hall of Fame in 1986.
