= Herbert Heilpern =

European soccer goalkeeper (1919–1999)

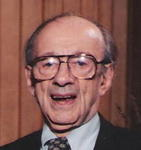

Personal information
- Date of birth: 1919
- Place of birth: Austria
- Date of death: September 27, 1999 (aged 79–80)
- Position: Goalkeeper

Herbert Heilpern (1919–1999) was a European born athlete and active builder of American soccer. He was inducted into the National Soccer Hall of Fame in 1988.

Heilpern was born in Austria. Before emigrating from Austria in 1939, he was a goalkeeper for the Hakoah club of Vienna. After escaping Nazi-occupied Europe, he played amateur soccer in New York City’s Eastern District League from 1939 to 1958 with the Bronx Jewish Soccer Club, Hakoah SC, and New World Club. His Hakoah teams won championships in 1941-42 as did his New World Club in 1948-49. He was coach of the 3rd Division Blue Star Soccer Club in the German-American Soccer League.

Heilpern was President of the German-American Soccer League of New York 1969-75, and was a co-founder of both the North American Soccer League in 1967 and the New York Cosmos in 1971. He joined the Executive Board of the German-American Junior League in 1976, and later served as President. As Soccer Coordinator for the City of New York, he developed year-round soccer facilities in the southern part of the state.He was named First Vice President of the Eastern New York Youth Soccer Association in 1985.

Heilpern died on September 27, 1999.
