= Ted Howard (soccer) =

American soccer executive (born 1946)

- Born: Theodore Howard; July 30, 1946 (age 80); Oakland, California, United States
- Known for: Soccer administrator, NBA Marketing

Theodore Howard (born July 30, 1946) is the former deputy general secretary for CONCACAF, the governing football body in the Caribbean and North and Central America.

He played soccer for the Chico Wild Cats at California State University between 1965 and 1967. He also served as assistant soccer coach for the soccer team during the 1968, 1969, and 1970 seasons and helped coach the Wildcats to two Western Regional Championships during those years. He was named to the City Of Chico Hall of Fame in 2011.

He completed a Bachelor of Science degree in marketing (graduating cum laude), and was a member of Delta Sigma Pi Scholarship Blue Key, and Phi Kappa Phi Honor Fraternity. In 1971, Howard completed his Master of Business Administration degree at Chico State.

He was also employed as executive director for the United States' North American Soccer League competition and Director and Group Manager, NBA (1988–1998. He was named to the US Soccer Hall of Fame in 2003.

In 2012, he succeeded Chuck Blazer as CONCACAF general secretary and was later succeeded by Enrique Sanz de Santamaría. He returned to his post as deputy general secretary following Sanz's appointment until 2017.
