= Gustav Randolph Manning =

German-American businessman and sports manager

G. Randolph Manning
- Manning in 1915

1st President of United States Soccer Federation
- In office 1913–1915
- Preceded by: position established
- Succeeded by: John Fernley

Personal details
- Born: Gustav Randolph Manning; December 13, 1873 Lewisham, England
- Died: December 1, 1953 (aged 79) New York City, United States
- Education: Friedrich Wilhelm University of Berlin; University of Freiburg
Association football career
- Position: Forward
Youth career
- 1883–1893: Berlin Cricket Club
Senior career*
| Years | Team | Apps | (Gls) |
| 1893–1897 | VfB Pankow | | |
| 1897–1898 | Freiburger FC | | |
| 1898–1899 | VfB Pankow | | |
- * Club domestic league appearances and goals

Gustav Randolph Manning (December 13, 1873 – December 1, 1953) was a German-American businessman and sports coach. Manning is best known for being the first ever President of the United States Soccer Federation, which he served from its founding in 1913 until 1915. Prior to his tenue with U.S. Soccer, Manning was involved with soccer club management across southern Germany, particularly with forming state associations.

== Early life ==
Gustav Manning, born in the London suburb of Lewisham, was one of four sons of Wolfgang Gustav Mannheimer, a Jewish merchant originally from Königsberg in East Prussia. The latter sold his company in the early 1880s and moved to Berlin, but like the whole family retained the anglicized name "Manning". In Berlin, father and sons joined the Berlin Cricket Club, where cricket and soccer were played. The sons Fred and Gustav played soccer in various Berlin clubs, including from 1893 for VfB Pankow, which was founded this year. Gustav Manning, who sometimes called himself Gus Randolph Manning, emphasizing his English origin, made friends there with his teammate Franz John who founded a club called FC Bayern Munich a few years later.

After his school days, Gustav Manning studied medicine, initially for three semesters at Friedrich Wilhelm University in Berlin, then in southwest Germany in Freiburg im Breisgau. There he also did his doctorate in medicine. In addition to his work as an assistant doctor at the medical university polyclinic in Straßburg, he played soccer at the Straßburger FV. At the end of 1897 Manning was a co-founder, active player and first chairman of Freiburger FC. After his return to Berlin, he was active as a player and chairman (1898–99) of the VfB Pankow.

In his function as secretary of the Association of South German Football Clubs (VsFV), Manning represented several southern German clubs at the founding meeting of the German Football Association in January 1900. Despite his British passport, he became the first secretary of the DFB and was responsible for drafting the association's statutes based on the English model. However, he resigned in October.

Manning emigrated to the United States in 1905 for professional reasons and founded the United States Football Association on April 5, 1913 in New York, which elected him as its first chairman on June 21 of the same year. Gustav Manning became the first American to become a member of the FIFA Executive Committee in 1948 . At the World Football Congress in Rio de Janeiro in 1950, he made a major effort to get Germany back into the world association. His efforts resulted in West Germany being allowed to take part in a soccer World Cup again in 1954.

Gustav Manning, who was inducted into the National Soccer Hall of Fame in 1950, died shortly before his 80th birthday. He was buried in Arlington National Cemetery.
