= Frank Borghi =

American soccer player

Personal information
- Date of birth: April 9, 1925
- Place of birth: St. Louis, Missouri, U.S.
- Date of death: February 2, 2015 (aged 89)
- Place of death: St. Louis, Missouri, U.S.
- Position: Goalkeeper

Senior career*
Years	Team	Apps	(Gls)
- St. Louis Simpkins-Ford

International career
1949–1954	United States	9	(0)
- * Club domestic league appearances and goals

Frank Borghi (April 9, 1925 – February 2, 2015) was an American soccer player who earned nine caps at goalkeeper for the national team. He played in the team's famous 1–0 victory against England in the 1950 FIFA World Cup.

== Athletic career ==
Borghi started his sports career as a professional baseball player, but turned to soccer instead. He chose the position of goalkeeper because he felt he lacked the necessary ball skills to play any other position. In fact, when he was in goal, he never kicked the ball, even for goal kicks (someone else took them); instead, thanks to his arm strength from playing baseball, he always threw the ball after he made a save. He played professionally for St. Louis Simpkins-Ford and helped them win the National Challenge Cup in 1948 and 1950.

He was selected to the U.S. national team in 1949 and played in four World Cup qualifying matches as well as all three games in the 1950 World Cup. Notably, he made several key saves to secure the 1–0 victory over heavily favored England — still considered one of the greatest upsets in the history of the World Cup. He also appeared for the U.S. in 1954 World Cup qualifying against Mexico. Borghi was inducted into the United States National Soccer Hall of Fame in 1976 along with the rest of his 1950 teammates.

== Personal life ==
Borghi was raised in The Hill neighborhood of St. Louis, Missouri.

Borghi served as a medic in World War II in a U.S. infantry unit that fought at the Battle of the Bulge and in the crossing of the Ludendorff Bridge in Remagen in March 1945. Borghi was awarded the Bronze Star and the Purple Heart.

Borghi retired from soccer to become a director of a funeral home in St. Louis until 2003. In January 2004, he and the four other living members of the 1950 World Cup Team (Walter Bahr, Harry Keough, Gino Pariani and John Souza) were recognized as Honorary All-Americans by the National Soccer Coaches Association of America at its annual convention in Charlotte, N.C.

Borghi was portrayed by Gerard Butler in the film The Game of Their Lives.

Borghi died in St. Louis on February 2, 2015. He was 89. He is buried in Jefferson Barracks National Cemetery in Lemay, Missouri.

== Documentary ==
Borghi was featured in the 2009 soccer documentary A Time for Champions discussing the U.S. upset victory over England in the 1950 World Cup. He was also featured in the documentary Voices of the Veterans discussing his service as a medic in the United States Army during World War II.
