= Frank Wallace (soccer) =

American soccer player

Personal information
- Full name: Frank Valicenti
- Date of birth: July 15, 1922
- Place of birth: St. Louis, Missouri, United States
- Date of death: November 13, 1979 (aged 57)
- Place of death: St. Louis, Missouri, United States
- Position: Forward

Senior career*
Years	Team	Apps	(Gls)
- St. Louis Wildcats
1945–1946	Raftery		
- Steamfitters
- St. Louis Simpkins-Ford

International career
1949–1950	United States	7	(3)
- * Club domestic league appearances and goals

Frank Wallace (born Frank Valicenti; July 15, 1922 – November 13, 1979) was an American international soccer player who played as forward. He earned 7 caps and scored 3 goals for the United States men's national soccer team, and played in the U.S. team's historic 1–0 victory over England in the 1950 FIFA World Cup. He is a member of the National Soccer Hall of Fame.

Wallace was born in St. Louis, Missouri as Frank Valicenti, but his family changed their name when he was a youth. During World War II, he was captured by the Germans and spent sixteen months in a prisoner of war camp. After returning to St. Louis, he played with Raftery during the 1945–1946 season. He was the third leading scorer in the St. Louis Major League during the 1947–1948 season while playing with Steamfitters. He later spent ten seasons with St. Louis Simpkins-Ford.

He was inducted into the National Soccer Hall of Fame in 1976 and the St. Louis Soccer Hall of Fame in 1975.

He died November 13, 1979, in St. Louis. He is buried at Resurrection Cemetery, Affton, Missouri.
