= Fred Beardsworth =

English footballer

Personal information
- Date of birth: 1899
- Place of birth: Leyland, Lancashire, England
- Date of death: 10 October 1964 (aged 64–65)
- Place of death: New Bedford, Massachusetts, United States
- Position: Halfback

Youth career
- 1908–1909: Farington Villa
- 1909–1914: Leyland Town

Senior career*
Years	Team	Apps	(Gls)
1914–1917	New Bedford Whalers		
1917–1919	Fore River		
1919–1921	Robins Dry Dock		
1921–	Booth Mills		
- Saylesville
- * Club domestic league appearances and goals

Fred Beardsworth (1899 – 10 October 1964) was an English association football halfback who played in the Southern New England Soccer League and the National Association Football League. He is a member of the National Soccer Hall of Fame.
