= List of American and Canadian soccer champions =

Despite each receiving FIFA-affiliated status in 1913, both the United States and Canada have lacked a consistent, multi-division soccer system until recently. Consequently, the determination of champions has been problematic at times. The United States did not have a truly national top flight league until the FIFA-sanctioned United Soccer Association and the "outlaw" National Professional Soccer League, which had a network television contract, merged in November 1967 to form the North American Soccer League (NASL). The NASL considered the two pre-merge forerunner leagues as part of its history.

Before 1967, there were several regional and city leagues of various levels of quality. For example, the first and second incarnations of the American Soccer League constituted the premier level of professional soccer in the Northeastern United States, but they and teams from the St. Louis Soccer League would regularly defeat the best the other had to offer. These are only two of the most notable leagues of the regional era, as there were professional and amateur competitions in Chicago, California, the greater Western United States, Ontario, and Western Canada, among several other regions.

While the creation of the NASL in 1968 brought bonafide top-flight competition to the U.S. and Canada, its collapse in 1984 saw a temporary return to the fragmented regional structure. The merger of the Western Soccer League and third iteration of the American Soccer League created a national second division in the U.S. known as the American Professional Soccer League (APSL) in 1990. The APSL later absorbed the Canadian Soccer League, which at the time was an attempt at a wholly first division within Canada.

It was not until the establishment of Major League Soccer (MLS) in 1996 as part of FIFA's agreement to award the United States the 1994 World Cup that there was again a truly national, sanctioned first division in either country. Top Canadian teams resided at the second division until MLS expanded to Canada in 2007.

Given the tumultuous history of professional soccer in the United States and Canada, there is a broad history of champions of various kinds in both countries, both in leagues that comprised both nations and cups that were held in only one. This article takes into account all these competitions to compile an accurate listing of American and Canadian soccer champions with an eye towards maintaining continuity.

== Background ==
For teams in the United States and Canada, there are three major domestic trophies.

The primary focus is the league championship, a postseason knockout tournament held between the best teams from the regular season. This is presently determined via the MLS Cup. American and Canadian sports leagues typically have such playoff systems. These have their roots in long travel distances common in U.S. and Canadian sports; to cut down on travel, leagues are typically aligned in geographic divisions and feature unbalanced schedules with teams playing more matches against opponents in the same division. Due to the unbalanced schedule typical in U.S. and Canadian leagues, not all teams face the same opponents, and some teams may not meet an even number of times during a regular season, if at all. This results in teams with identical records that have faced different opponents differing numbers of times, making team records alone an imperfect measure of league supremacy. The playoffs allow for head-to-head elimination-style competition between teams to counterbalance this.

Secondary is the recognition of the best regular season record (an accomplishment known as the league premiership in Australia and New Zealand, countries with similar league structure to the U.S. and Canada). The MLS team with the highest point total during the regular season is awarded the Supporters' Shield.

Thirdly, there are the two countries' respective domestic cup competitions: the U.S. Open Cup and the Canadian Championship. These tournaments are unique to soccer among professional sports in the U.S. and Canada, as no other major team sport conducts competition outside of regular league play.

Additionally, American and Canadian clubs participate in the CONCACAF Champions Cup, a continental club competition in which the United States is allocated four qualification spots and Canada one. For American clubs, the winners of the MLS Cup, Supporters' Shield, and U.S. Open Cup all qualify, along with the regular season conference champion that does not win the Shield. The lone Canadian berth is determined by the Canadian Championship. Finally, there is the world championship as determined by the FIFA Club World Cup, a berth to which is earned by winning the Champions Cup.

American and Canadian soccer clubs exist in a franchise system, rather than a promotion and relegation system. As a result, teams do not systematically move between levels each season. This is standard among American and Canadian major and minor sports leagues and is part of the franchise rights granted by the leagues. Recently, a trend has developed where a club from the lower divisions may be "promoted" via an expansion franchise awarded by Major League Soccer.

The results in this article come from the United States Soccer Federation, the Canadian Soccer Association, the Rec.Sport.Soccer Statistics Foundation, and the American Soccer History Archives.

== Major titles ==
=== American competitions ===
At various times, Canadian clubs have competed in the top-tier of American soccer, either in place of or alongside a Canadian top-tier league. Currently, three Canadian clubs compete in Major League Soccer.

==== United Soccer Association (1967) ====
Year	Champions	Runners-up	Regular season	Runners-up	Leading goalscorer(s)	Goals
1967	Los Angeles Wolves	Washington Whips	Washington Whips	Los Angeles Wolves	(Italy) Roberto Boninsegna (Chicago Mustangs)	10

==== National Professional Soccer League (1967) ====
Year	Champions	Runners-up	Regular season	Runners-up	Leading goalscorer(s)	Goals
1967	Oakland Clippers	Baltimore Bays	Oakland Clippers	Baltimore Bays	(Spain) Yanko Daucik (Toronto Falcons)	20

- Oakland also won the NPSL Commissioner's Cup nine days after winning the NPSL Finals.

==== North American Soccer League (1968–1984) ====
Year	Champions (tot)	Runners-up	Reg Season (tot)	Runners-up	Leading goalscorer(s)	Goals
1968	Atlanta Chiefs	San Diego Toros	San Diego Toros	Oakland Clippers	(Poland) John Kowalik (Chicago Mustangs)	30
1969	N/A^{1}	N/A^{1}	Kansas City Spurs	Atlanta Chiefs	(South Africa) Kaizer Motaung (Atlanta Chiefs)	16
1970	Rochester Lancers	Washington Darts	Washington Darts	Atlanta Chiefs	(Greece) Kirk Apostolidis (Dallas Tornado)	16
1971	Dallas Tornado	Atlanta Chiefs	Rochester Lancers	Atlanta Chiefs	(United States) Carlos Metidieri (Rochester Lancers)	19
1972	New York Cosmos	St. Louis Stars	New York Cosmos	St. Louis Stars	(Bermuda) Randy Horton (New York Cosmos)	9
1973	Philadelphia Atoms	Dallas Tornado	Dallas Tornado	Philadelphia Atoms	(Trinidad and Tobago) Warren Archibald (Miami Toros) (United States) Ilija Mitic (Dallas Tornado)	12
1974	Los Angeles Aztecs	Miami Toros	Los Angeles Aztecs	Miami Toros	(United States) Paul Child (San Jose Earthquakes)	15
1975	Tampa Bay Rowdies	Portland Timbers	Portland Timbers	Tampa Bay Rowdies	(Trinidad and Tobago) Steve David (Miami Toros)	23
1976	Toronto Metros-Croatia	Minnesota Kicks	Tampa Bay Rowdies	New York Cosmos	(South Africa) Derek Smethurst (Tampa Bay Rowdies)	20
1977	Cosmos (2)^{2}	Seattle Sounders	Ft. Lauderdale Strikers	Dallas Tornado	(Trinidad and Tobago) Steve David (Los Angeles Aztecs)	26
1978	Cosmos (3)^{2}	Tampa Bay Rowdies	Cosmos (2)^{2}	Vancouver Whitecaps	(Italy) Giorgio Chinaglia (Cosmos)	34
1979	Vancouver Whitecaps	Tampa Bay Rowdies	New York Cosmos (3)	Houston Hurricane	(Italy) Giorgio Chinaglia (New York Cosmos)	26
1980	New York Cosmos (4)	Ft. Lauderdale Strikers	New York Cosmos (4)	Seattle Sounders	(Italy) Giorgio Chinaglia (New York Cosmos)	32
1981	Chicago Sting	New York Cosmos	New York Cosmos (5)	Chicago Sting	(Italy) Giorgio Chinaglia (New York Cosmos)	29
1982	New York Cosmos (5)	Seattle Sounders	New York Cosmos (6)	Seattle Sounders	(Argentina) Ricardo Alonso (Jacksonville Tea Men)	21
1983	Tulsa Roughnecks	Toronto Blizzard	New York Cosmos (7)	Vancouver Whitecaps	(Paraguay) Roberto Cabanas (New York Cosmos)	25
1984	Chicago Sting (2)	Toronto Blizzard	Chicago Sting	San Diego Sockers	(Socialist Federal Republic of Yugoslavia) Steve Zungul (Golden Bay Earthquakes)	20

- ^Note 1 – The 1969 season featured no playoffs; the league title was awarded to the team with the most points in the season.
- ^Note 2 – The New York Cosmos dropped "New York" from name for the 1977 and 1978 seasons, then returned to the full name in 1979 season.

==== Major League Soccer (1996–present) ====
Year	MLS Cup (Total)	Runners-up	Supporters' Shield (Total)	Runners-up	Leading goalscorer(s)	Goals
1996	D.C. United	Los Angeles Galaxy	Tampa Bay Mutiny	Los Angeles Galaxy	(United States) Roy Lassiter (Tampa Bay Mutiny)	27
1997	D.C. United (2)	Colorado Rapids	D.C. United	Kansas City Wizards	(Bolivia) Jaime Moreno (D.C. United)	16
1998	Chicago Fire	D.C. United	Los Angeles Galaxy	D.C. United	(Trinidad and Tobago) Stern John (Columbus Crew)	26
1999	D.C. United (3)	Los Angeles Galaxy	D.C. United (2)	Los Angeles Galaxy	(United States) Jason Kreis (Dallas Burn) (United States) Roy Lassiter (D.C. United) (Trinidad and Tobago) Stern John (Columbus Crew)	18
2000	Kansas City Wizards	Chicago Fire	Kansas City Wizards	Chicago Fire	(Senegal) Mamadou Diallo (Tampa Bay Mutiny)	26
2001	San Jose Earthquakes	Los Angeles Galaxy	Miami Fusion	Chicago Fire	(Honduras) Alex Pineda Chacon (Miami Fusion)	19
2002	Los Angeles Galaxy	New England Revolution	Los Angeles Galaxy (2)	San Jose Earthquakes	(Guatemala) Carlos Ruiz (Los Angeles Galaxy)	24
2003	San Jose Earthquakes (2)	Chicago Fire	Chicago Fire	San Jose Earthquakes	(Guatemala) Carlos Ruiz (Los Angeles Galaxy) (United States) Taylor Twellman (New England Revolution)	15
2004	D.C. United (4)	Kansas City Wizards	Columbus Crew	Kansas City Wizards	(United States) Brian Ching (San Jose Earthquakes) (United States) Eddie Johnson (Dallas Burn)	12
2005	Los Angeles Galaxy (2)	New England Revolution	San Jose Earthquakes	New England Revolution	(United States) Taylor Twellman (New England Revolution)	17
2006	Houston Dynamo	New England Revolution	D.C. United (3)	FC Dallas	(United States) Jeff Cunningham (Real Salt Lake)	16
2007	Houston Dynamo (2)	New England Revolution	D.C. United (4)	Chivas USA	(Brazil) Luciano Emilio (D.C. United)	20
2008	Columbus Crew	New York Red Bulls	Columbus Crew (2)	Houston Dynamo	(United States) Landon Donovan (Los Angeles Galaxy)	20
2009	Real Salt Lake	Los Angeles Galaxy	Columbus Crew (3)	Los Angeles Galaxy	(United States) Jeff Cunningham (FC Dallas)	17
2010	Colorado Rapids	FC Dallas	Los Angeles Galaxy (3)	Real Salt Lake	(United States) Chris Wondolowski (San Jose Earthquakes)	18
2011	Los Angeles Galaxy (3)	Houston Dynamo	Los Angeles Galaxy (4)	Seattle Sounders FC	(Canada) Dwayne De Rosario (D.C. United) (United States) Chris Wondolowski (San Jose Earthquakes)	16
2012	Los Angeles Galaxy (4)	Houston Dynamo	San Jose Earthquakes (2)	Sporting Kansas City	(United States) Chris Wondolowski (San Jose Earthquakes)	27
2013	Sporting Kansas City (2)	Real Salt Lake	New York Red Bulls	Sporting Kansas City	(Brazil) Camilo (Vancouver Whitecaps FC)	22
2014	Los Angeles Galaxy (5)	New England Revolution	Seattle Sounders FC	Los Angeles Galaxy	(England) Bradley Wright-Phillips (New York Red Bulls)	27
2015	Portland Timbers	Columbus Crew SC	New York Red Bulls (2)	FC Dallas	(Italy) Sebastian Giovinco (Toronto FC) (Sierra Leone) Kei Kamara (Columbus Crew SC)	22
2016	Seattle Sounders FC	Toronto FC	FC Dallas	Colorado Rapids	(England) Bradley Wright-Phillips (New York Red Bulls)	24
2017	Toronto FC	Seattle Sounders FC	Toronto FC	New York City FC	(Hungary) Nemanja Nikolić (Chicago Fire)	24
2018	Atlanta United FC	Portland Timbers	New York Red Bulls (3)	Atlanta United FC	(Venezuela) Josef Martínez (Atlanta United FC)	31
2019	Seattle Sounders FC (2)	Toronto FC	Los Angeles FC	New York City FC	(Mexico) Carlos Vela (Los Angeles FC)	34
2020	Columbus Crew SC (2)	Seattle Sounders FC	Philadelphia Union	Toronto FC	(Uruguay) Diego Rossi (Los Angeles FC)	14
2021	New York City FC	Portland Timbers	New England Revolution	Colorado Rapids	(Argentina) Valentín Castellanos (New York City FC)	19
2022	Los Angeles FC	Philadelphia Union	Los Angeles FC (2)	Philadelphia Union	(Germany) Hany Mukhtar (Nashville SC)	23
2023	Columbus Crew (3)	Los Angeles FC	FC Cincinnati	Orlando City SC	(Gabon) Denis Bouanga (Los Angeles FC)	20
2024	Los Angeles Galaxy (6)	New York Red Bulls	Inter Miami CF	Columbus Crew	(Belgium) Christian Benteke (D.C. United)	23
2025	Inter Miami CF	Vancouver Whitecaps FC	Philadelphia Union (2)	FC Cincinnati	(Argentina) Lionel Messi (Inter Miami CF)	29
2026			Nashville SC	Vancouver Whitecaps FC	(Argentina) Lionel Messi (Inter Miami CF)	26

==== U.S. Open Cup (1914–present) ====
===== Historical era =====
Year	Champions (tot)	Score	Runners–up	Venue	Location	Attendance
1914	Brooklyn Field Club	2–1	Brooklyn Celtic	Coates Field	Pawtucket, Rhode Island	10,000
1915	Bethlehem Steel F.C.	3–1	Brooklyn Celtic	Taylor Field	Bethlehem, Pennsylvania	7,500
1916	Bethlehem Steel F.C. (2)	1–0	Fall River Rovers	Coates Field	Pawtucket, Rhode Island	10,000
1917	Fall River Rovers	1–0	Bethlehem Steel F.C.	Coates Field	Pawtucket, Rhode Island	7,000
1918	Bethlehem Steel F.C. (3)	2–2 (a.e.t.); 3–0	Fall River Rovers	Coates Field; Federal League Grounds	Pawtucket, Rhode Island; Harrison, New Jersey	13,000; 10,000
1919	Bethlehem Steel F.C. (4)	2–0	Paterson F.C.	Athletic Field	Fall River, Massachusetts	9,000
1920	Ben Millers	2–1	Fore River	Handlan's Park	St. Louis, Missouri	12,000
1921	Brooklyn Robins Dry Dock	4–2	St. Louis Scullin Steel F.C.	Athletic Field	Fall River, Massachusetts	6,000
1922	St. Louis Scullin Steel F.C.	3–2	Todd Shipyard	High School Field	St. Louis, Missouri	8,568
1923	Paterson F.C.	2–2 (a.e.t.)^{3}	St. Louis Scullin Steel F.C.	Federal League Grounds	Harrison, New Jersey	15,000
1924	Fall River F.C.	4–2	St. Louis Vesper Buick	High School Field	St. Louis, Missouri	14,000
1925	Shawsheen Indians	3–0	Chicago Canadian Club	Mark's Stadium	North Tiverton, Rhode Island	2,500
1926	Bethlehem Steel F.C. (5)	7–2	Ben Millers	Ebbets Field	Brooklyn, New York	18,000
1927	Fall River F.C. (2)	7–0	Holley Carburetor F.C.	University of Detroit Stadium	Detroit	10,000
1928	New York Nationals	1–1 (a.e.t.); 3–0	Chicago Bricklayers	Polo Grounds; Soldier Field	New York City; Chicago	16,000; 15,000
1929	New York Hakoah	2–0; 3–0	St. Louis Madison Kennel	Sportsman's Park; Dexter Park	St. Louis, Missouri; Woodhaven, New York	15,000; 21,583
1930	Fall River F.C. (3)	7–2; 2–1	Cleveland Bruell Insurance	Polo Grounds; Luna Park	New York City; Cleveland	10,000; 3,500
1931	Fall River F.C. (4)^{4}	6–2; 1–1; 2–0	Chicago Bricklayers	Polo Grounds; Mills Stadium; Sparta Field	New York City; Chicago; Chicago	12,000; 8,000; 4,500
1932	New Bedford Whalers	3–3; 5–2	Stix, Baer and Fuller F.C.	Sportsman's Park; Sportsman's Park	St. Louis, Missouri; St. Louis, Missouri	7,181; 7,371
1933	Stix, Baer and Fuller F.C.	1–0; 2–1	New York Americans	Sportsman's Park; Starlight Park	St. Louis, Missouri; Bronx, New York	15,200; 4,200
1934	Stix, Baer and Fuller F.C. (2)	4–2 (a.e.t.); 2–3; 5–0	Pawtucket Rangers	Walsh Memorial Stadium; Coates Field; Walsh Memorial Stadium	St. Louis, Missouri; Pawtucket, Rhode Island; St. Louis, Missouri	7,122; 4,500; 7,657
1935	St. Louis Central Breweries (3)^{5}	5–2; 1–1 (a.e.t.); 1–3	Pawtucket Rangers	Walsh Memorial Stadium; Coates Field; Newark School Stadium	St. Louis Missouri; Pawtucket, Rhode Island; Newark, New Jersey	4,500; 4,000; 3,000
1936	Philadelphia German-Americans	2–2; 3–0	St. Louis Shamrocks	Walsh Memorial Stadium; Rifle Club Grounds	St Louis, Missouri; Philadelphia	3,400; 8,000
1937	New York Americans	0–1; 4–2	St. Louis Shamrocks	Public Schools Stadium; Starlight Park	St. Louis, Missouri; Bronx, New York	5,083; 6,000
1938	Chicago Sparta	3–0; 3–2	Brooklyn St. Mary's Celtic	Sparta Stadium; Starlight Park	Chicago; Bronx, New York	4,000; 10,000
1939	Brooklyn St. Mary's Celtic	1–0; 4–1	Chicago Manhattan Beer	Sparta Stadium; Starlight Park	Chicago; Bronx, New York	5,000; 8,000
1940	Baltimore S.C. & Chicago Sparta (2)	0–0; 2–2 (a.e.t.)	co-champions^{6}	Bugle Field; Sparta Stadium	Baltimore; Chicago	N/A
1941	Pawtucket F.C.	4–2; 4–3 (a.e.t.)	Detroit Chrysler	N/A	Pawtucket, Rhode Island; Detroit	N/A
1942	Pittsburgh Gallatin	2–1; 4–2	Pawtucket F.C.	Legion Field; Coates Field	Donora, Pennsylvania; Pawtucket, Rhode Island	N/A
1943	Brooklyn Hispano	2–2 (a.e.t.); 3–2	Morgan Strasser	Starlight Park; Starlight Park	Bronx, New York; Bronx, New York	N/A
1944	Brooklyn Hispano (2)	4–0	Morgan Strasser	Polo Grounds	New York City	N/A
1945	Brookhattan	4–1; 2–1	Cleveland Americans	Starlight Park; Shaw Field	Bronx, New York; Cleveland, Ohio	N/A
1946	Chicago Viking A.A.	1–1; 2–1	Ponta Delgada S.C.	Mark's Stadium; Comiskey Park	North Tiverton, Rhode Island; Chicago	N/A
1947	Ponta Delgada S.C.	6–1; 3–2	Chicago Sparta	N/A; Sparta Stadium	Fall River, Massachusetts; Chicago	N/A
1948	St. Louis Simpkins-Ford	3–2	Brookhattan-Galicia	Sportsman's Park	St. Louis, Missouri	2,226
1949	Morgan Strasser	0–1; 4–2	Philadelphia Nationals	Holmes Stadium; Bridgeville Park	Philadelphia; Pittsburgh	N/A; 1,000
1950	St. Louis Simpkins-Ford (2)	2–0; 1–1	Ponta Delgada S.C.	N/A	St. Louis, Missouri; Tiverton, Rhode Island	N/A
1951	New York German-Hungarians	2–4; 6–2 (a.e.t.)	Heidelberg S.C.	N/A; Metropolitan Oval	Pittsburgh; Queens, New York	N/A
1952	Harmarville Hurricanes	3–4; 4–1 (a.e.t.)	Philadelphia Nationals	N/A	Philadelphia; Harmarville, Pennsylvania	N/A
1953	Chicago Falcons	2–0; 1–0	Harmarville Hurricanes	Sparta Stadium; N/A	Chicago; Harmarville, Pennsylvania	N/A
1954	New York Americans (2)	1–1; 2–0	St. Louis Kutis S.C.	N/A; Triborough Stadium	St. Louis, Missouri; Randall's Island, New York	N/A
1955	S.C. Eintracht	2–0	Los Angeles Danes	Rancho La Cienega Stadium	Los Angeles	N/A
1956	Harmarville Hurricanes (2)	0–1; 3–1 (a.e.t.)	Chicago Schwaben	N/A	Chicago; Harmarville, Pennsylvania	N/A
1957	St. Louis Kutis S.C.	3–0; 3–1	New York Hakoah	N/A; Zerega Oval	St. Louis, Missouri; Bronx, New York	N/A
1958	Los Angeles Kickers	2–1 (a.e.t.)	Baltimore Pompei	N/A	Baltimore, Maryland	N/A
1959	McIlvaine Canvasbacks	4–3	Fall River S.C.	Rancho La Cienega Stadium	Los Angeles	N/A
1960	Philadelphia Ukrainian Nationals	5–3 (a.e.t.)	Los Angeles Kickers	Edison Field	Philadelphia	N/A
1961	Philadelphia Ukrainian Nationals (2)	2–2; 5–2	Los Angeles Scots	Rancho La Cienega Stadium; N/A	Los Angeles; Philadelphia	N/A
1962	New York Hungaria	3–2	San Francisco Scots	Eintracht Oval	New York City	N/A
1963	Philadelphia Ukrainian Nationals (3)	1–0 (a.e.t.)	Los Angeles Armenians	N/A	Philadelphia	N/A
1964	Los Angeles Kickers (2)	2–2 (a.e.t.); 2–0	Philadelphia Ukrainian Nationals	Cambria Field; Wrigley Field	Philadelphia; Los Angeles	N/A
1965	New York Ukrainians	1–1; 4–1 (a.e.t.)	Chicago Hansa	Ukrainians Field; Hanson Stadium	New York City; Chicago	N/A
1966	Philadelphia Ukrainian Nationals (4)	1–0; 3–0	Orange County SC	Rancho La Cienega Stadium; N/A	Los Angeles; Philadelphia	N/A
1967	Greek American AA	4–2	Orange County SC	Eintracht Oval	New York City	2,500
1968	Greek American AA (2)	1–1; 1–0	Chicago Olympic	Hanson Stadium; Eintracht Oval	Chicago; New York City	N/A
1969	Greek American AA (3)	1–0	Montabello Armenians	N/A	N/A	N/A
1970	Elizabeth S.C.	2–1	Los Angeles Croatia	N/A	N/A	N/A
1971	New York Hota	6–4 (a.e.t.)	San Pedro Yugoslavs	N/A	N/A	N/A
1972	Elizabeth S.C. (2)	1–0	San Pedro Yugoslavs	N/A	N/A	N/A
1973	Maccabi Los Angeles	5–3 (a.e.t.)	Cleveland Inter	Rancho La Cienega Stadium	Los Angeles	N/A
1974	Greek American AA (4)	2–0	Chicago Croatian	N/A	N/A	N/A
1975	Maccabi Los Angeles (2)	1–0	New York Inter-Giuliana	N/A	N/A	N/A
1976	San Francisco A.C.	1–0	New York Inter-Giuliana	N/A	N/A	N/A
1977	Maccabi Los Angeles (3)	5–1	Philadelphia United German-Hungarians	N/A	N/A	N/A
1978	Maccabi Los Angeles (4)	2–0	Bridgeport Vasco da Gama	N/A	N/A	N/A
1979	Brooklyn Dodgers S.C.	2–1	Chicago Croatian	N/A	N/A	N/A
1980	New York Pancyprian-Freedoms	3–2	Maccabi Los Angeles	N/A	N/A	N/A
1981	Maccabi Los Angeles (5)	5–1	Brooklyn Dodgers S.C.	N/A	N/A	N/A
1982	New York Pancyprian-Freedoms (2)	4–3 (a.e.t.)	Maccabi Los Angeles	N/A	N/A	N/A
1983	New York Pancyprian-Freedoms (3)	4–3	St. Louis Kutis S.C.	N/A	N/A	N/A
1984	New York AO Krete	4–2	San Pedro Yugoslavs	N/A	N/A	N/A
1985	San Francisco Greek American	2–1	St. Louis Kutis S.C.	N/A	N/A	N/A
1986	St. Louis Kutis S.C. (2)	1–0	San Pedro Yugoslavs	N/A	N/A	N/A
1987	Club España	0–0 (3–2 p)	Seattle Mitre Eagles	N/A	N/A	N/A
1988	St. Louis Busch S.C.	2–1 (a.e.t.)	San Francisco Greek American	St. Louis Soccer Park	Fenton, Missouri	N/A
1989	St. Petersburg Kickers	2–1 (a.e.t.)	Greek American AA	St. Louis Soccer Park	Fenton, Missouri	N/A
1990	A.A.C. Eagles	2–1	Brooklyn Italians	Kuntz Stadium	Indianapolis	3,116
1991	Brooklyn Italians (2)^{7}	1–0	Richardson Rockets	Brooklyn College	Brooklyn, New York	N/A
1992	San Jose Oaks	2–1	Bridgeport Vasco da Gama	Kuntz Stadium	Indianapolis	2,500
1993	San Francisco CD Mexico	5–0	Philadelphia United German-Hungarians	Kuntz Stadium	Indianapolis	N/A
1994	San Francisco Greek American (2)	3–0	Milwaukee Bavarians	German-Hungarian Field	Oakford, Pennsylvania	400

===== Modern era =====
Year	Champions (tot)	Score	Runners–up	Venue	Location	Attendance
1995	Richmond Kickers	1–1 (4–2 p)	El Paso Patriots	Socorro Sportsplex	El Paso, Texas	7,378
1996	D.C. United	3–0	Rochester Rhinos	RFK Stadium	Washington, D.C.	7,234
1997	Dallas Burn	0–0 (a.e.t.) (5–3 p)	D.C. United	Carroll Stadium at IUPUI	Indianapolis	9,766
1998	Chicago Fire	2–1 (a.e.t.)	Columbus Crew	Soldier Field	Chicago	18,615
1999	Rochester Rhinos	2–0	Colorado Rapids	Crew Stadium	Columbus, Ohio	4,555
2000	Chicago Fire (2)	2–1	Miami Fusion	Soldier Field	Chicago	19,146
2001	Los Angeles Galaxy	2–1 (a.e.t.)	New England Revolution	Titan Stadium	Fullerton, California	4,195
2002	Columbus Crew	1–0	Los Angeles Galaxy	Crew Stadium	Columbus, Ohio	6,054
2003	Chicago Fire (3)	1–0	MetroStars	Giants Stadium	East Rutherford, New Jersey	5,183
2004	Kansas City Wizards	1–0 (a.e.t.)	Chicago Fire	Arrowhead Stadium	Kansas City, Missouri	8,819
2005	Los Angeles Galaxy (2)	1–0	FC Dallas	Home Depot Center	Carson, California	10,000
2006	Chicago Fire (4)	3–1	Los Angeles Galaxy	Toyota Park	Bridgeview, Illinois	8,185
2007	New England Revolution	3–2	FC Dallas	Pizza Hut Park	Frisco, Texas	10,618
2008	D.C. United (2)	2–1	Charleston Battery	RFK Stadium	Washington, D.C.	8,212
2009	Seattle Sounders FC	2–1	D.C. United	RFK Stadium	Washington, D.C.	17,329
2010	Seattle Sounders FC (2)	2–1	Columbus Crew	Qwest Field	Seattle	31,311
2011	Seattle Sounders FC (3)	2–0	Chicago Fire	CenturyLink Field	Seattle	35,615
2012	Sporting Kansas City (2)	1–1 (a.e.t.) (3–2 p)	Seattle Sounders FC	Livestrong Sporting Park	Kansas City, Kansas	18,863
2013	D.C. United (3)	1–0	Real Salt Lake	Rio Tinto Stadium	Sandy, Utah	17,608
2014	Seattle Sounders FC (4)	3–1 (a.e.t.)	Philadelphia Union	PPL Park	Chester, Pennsylvania	15,256
2015	Sporting Kansas City (3)	1–1 (a.e.t.) (7–6 p)	Philadelphia Union	PPL Park	Chester, Pennsylvania	14,463
2016	FC Dallas (2)	4–2	New England Revolution	Toyota Stadium	Frisco, Texas	16,612
2017	Sporting Kansas City (4)	2–1	New York Red Bulls	Children's Mercy Park	Kansas City, Kansas	21,523
2018	Houston Dynamo	3–0	Philadelphia Union	BBVA Compass Stadium	Houston, Texas	16,060
2019	Atlanta United FC	2–1	Minnesota United FC	Mercedes-Benz Stadium	Atlanta, Georgia	35,709
2020	canceled due to COVID-19 pandemic					
2021	canceled due to COVID-19 pandemic					
2022	Orlando City SC	3–0	Sacramento Republic FC	Exploria Stadium	Orlando, Florida	25,527
2023	Houston Dynamo (2)	2–1	Inter Miami CF	DRV PNK Stadium	Fort Lauderdale, Florida	20,288
2024	Los Angeles FC	3–1 (a.e.t.)	Sporting Kansas City	BMO Stadium	Los Angeles, California	22,214
2025	Nashville SC	2–1	Austin FC	Q2 Stadium	Austin, Texas	20,738
2026	St. Louis City SC	0–0 (a.e.t.) (5–3 p)	Columbus Crew	ScottsMiracle-Gro Field	Columbus, Ohio	20,250

- ^Note 3 – Championship awarded to Paterson when Scullin were unable to field a team for the replay, due to injuries and players under baseball contracts beginning the baseball season
- ^Note 4 – Before the Spring 1931 season, Fall River F.C. moved to New York City and merged with New York Soccer Club to become the New York Yankees. However, they began the 1931 tournament under the name Fall River, and as such were required to play as Fall River for the remainder of it, and won the Cup. Before the Fall 1931 season, the Yankees moved again, this time back north to New Bedford, Massachusetts. They merged with Fall River F.C. to become the New Bedford Whalers, and again won the Cup in 1932. The USSF officially credits "Fall River F.C." with four championships in total, and "New Bedford Whalers" with one.
- ^Note 5 – St. Louis Soccer League team names were determined by the club's respective corporate sponsor. The team known as Hellrungs from 1929 to 1931 was also known as "Stix, Baer and Fuller F.C." from 1931 to 1934, "St. Louis Central Breweries F.C." from 1934 to 1935, and "St. Louis Shamrocks" from 1935 to 1938. As the change was only cosmetic and no relocations or mergers with clubs resulting in new rosters were made, the club's title history continues with the name changes.
- ^Note 6 – Aggregate drawn 2–2, Championship shared when details for a third game could not be agreed upon.
- ^Note 7 – Brooklyn Dodgers S.C. returned to their original name of "Brooklyn Italians" before the 1990s (the club states the change was in 1974, though later U.S. Open Cup tournaments have them registered under the Dodgers name).

=== Canadian competitions ===
==== Canadian Championship ====
Year	Champions (tot)	Score (if applicable)	Runners–up
2008	Montreal Impact	Round-robin	Toronto FC
2009	Toronto FC	Round-robin	Vancouver Whitecaps
2010	Toronto FC (2)	Round-robin	Vancouver Whitecaps
2011	Toronto FC (3)	1–1; 2–1	Vancouver Whitecaps FC
2012	Toronto FC (4)	1–1; 1–0	Vancouver Whitecaps FC
2013	Montreal Impact (2)	0–0; 2–2 (a)	Vancouver Whitecaps FC
2014	Montreal Impact (3)	1–1; 1–0	Toronto FC
2015	Vancouver Whitecaps FC	2–2; 2–0	Montreal Impact
2016	Toronto FC (5)	1–0; 1–2 (a)	Vancouver Whitecaps FC
2017	Toronto FC (6)	1–1; 2–1	Montreal Impact
2018	Toronto FC (7)	2–2; 5–2	Vancouver Whitecaps FC
2019	Montreal Impact (4)	1–0; 0–1 (3–1 p)	Toronto FC
2020	Toronto FC (8)	1–1 (5–4 p)	Forge FC
2021	CF Montréal (5)	1–0	Toronto FC
2022	Vancouver Whitecaps FC (2)	1–1 (5–3 p)	Toronto FC
2023	Vancouver Whitecaps FC (3)	2–1	CF Montréal
2024	Vancouver Whitecaps FC (4)	0–0 (4–2 p)	Toronto FC
2025	Vancouver Whitecaps FC (5)	4–2	Vancouver FC
2026	Forge FC	1–1 (a.e.t.) (4–2 p)	CF Montréal

=== Multiple majors in one season ===
==== Trebles ====
In 2017, Toronto FC completed a treble of Supporters' Shield, MLS Cup and Canadian Championship, the first treble of any kind achieved by either an American or Canadian club since the beginning of Major League Soccer in 1996.

Year	Club (number of trebles)	Honors
2017	Toronto FC	Supporters' Shield, MLS Cup, Canadian Championship

==== Doubles ====
Listed here are the teams to achieve two major accomplishments in one season since 1968.

Year	Club (number of doubles)	Honors
1972	New York Cosmos	Best regular season record, NASL Final
1974	Los Angeles Aztecs	Best regular season record, NASL Final
1978	Cosmos (2)	Best regular season record, Soccer Bowl
1980	New York Cosmos (3)	Best regular season record, Soccer Bowl
1982	New York Cosmos (4)	Best regular season record, Soccer Bowl
1984	Chicago Sting	Best regular season record, NASL Finals
1996	D.C. United	MLS Cup, U.S. Open Cup
1997	D.C. United (2)	Supporters' Shield, MLS Cup
1998	Chicago Fire	MLS Cup, U.S. Open Cup
1999	D.C. United (3)	Supporters' Shield, MLS Cup
2000	Kansas City Wizards	Supporters' Shield, MLS Cup
2002	Los Angeles Galaxy	Supporters' Shield, MLS Cup
2003	Chicago Fire (2)	U.S. Open Cup, Supporters' Shield
2005	Los Angeles Galaxy (2)	U.S. Open Cup, MLS Cup
2008	Columbus Crew	Supporters' Shield, MLS Cup
2011	Los Angeles Galaxy (3)	Supporters' Shield, MLS Cup
2014	Seattle Sounders FC	U.S. Open Cup, Supporters' Shield
2016	FC Dallas	U.S. Open Cup, Supporters' Shield
2022	Los Angeles FC	Supporters' Shield, MLS Cup

=== Overall totals ===
As of October 2026

Defunct franchises: †.

Team	D1 League Championship	D1 Regular Season	Domestic Cup^{8}	Continental Championship	Total	Last Major
Los Angeles Galaxy	6	4	2	1	13	2024 LC
D.C. United	4	4	3	2	13	2013 DC
New York Cosmos^{9} ^{10}	5	7	0	0	12	1983 RS
Toronto FC^{12}	1	1	8	0	10	2020 DC
Seattle Sounders FC^{9}	2	1	4	1	8	2022 CC
Columbus Crew	3	3	1	0	7	2023 LC
Sporting Kansas City	2	1	4	0	7	2017 DC
Chicago Fire FC	1	1	4	0	6	2006 DC
Vancouver Whitecaps FC^{9} ^{12}	1	0	5	0	6	2025 DC
CF Montréal^{11} ^{12}	0	0	5	0	5	2021 DC
San Jose Earthquakes^{9}	2	2	0	0	4	2012 RS
Houston Dynamo FC	2	0	2	0	4	2023 DC
Los Angeles FC	1	2	1	0	4	2024 DC
Chicago Sting †	2	1	0	0	3	1984 LC
New York Red Bulls	0	3	0	0	3	2018 RS
FC Dallas	0	1	2	0	3	2016 RS
Inter Miami CF	1	1	0	0	2	2025 LC
Portland Timbers^{9}	1	1	0	0	2	2015 LC
Tampa Bay Rowdies^{9} ^{10}	1	1	0	0	2	1976 RS
Los Angeles Aztecs †	1	1	0	0	2	1974 LC
Dallas Tornado †	1	1	0	0	2	1973 RS
Rochester Lancers †	1	1	0	0	2	1971 RS
Oakland Clippers †	1	1	0	0	2	1967 LC
Atlanta United FC	1	0	1	0	2	2019 DC
Philadelphia Union	0	2	0	0	2	2025 RS
Fort Lauderdale Strikers / Washington Darts †	0	2	0	0	2	1977 RS
Nashville SC	0	1	1	0	2	2026 RS
New England Revolution	0	1	1	0	2	2021 RS
New York City FC	1	0	0	0	1	2021 LC
Colorado Rapids	1	0	0	0	1	2010 LC
Real Salt Lake	1	0	0	0	1	2009 LC
Tulsa Roughnecks †	1	0	0	0	1	1983 LC
Toronto Blizzard † ^{12}	1	0	0	0	1	1976 LC
Philadelphia Atoms †	1	0	0	0	1	1973 LC
Atlanta Chiefs †	1	0	0	0	1	1968 LC
Los Angeles Wolves †	1	0	0	0	1	1967 LC
FC Cincinnati	0	1	0	0	1	2023 RS
Miami Fusion †	0	1	0	0	1	2001 RS
Tampa Bay Mutiny †	0	1	0	0	1	1996 RS
Kansas City Spurs †	0	1	0	0	1	1969 RS
San Diego Toros †	0	1	0	0	1	1968 RS
Washington Whips †	0	1	0	0	1	1967 RS
Forge FC^{12}	0	0	1	0	1	2026 DC
St. Louis City SC	0	0	1	0	1	2026 DC
Orlando City SC	0	0	1	0	1	2022 DC
Rochester Rhinos †	0	0	1	0	1	1999 DC
Richmond Kickers^{10}	0	0	1	0	1	1995 DC

- ^Note 8 – If the full histories of the domestic cups were included, the table would be some 150 teams long and include dozens of defunct, historical, and strictly amateur (North American Division 4 or 5) squads. As North American Soccer League teams did not compete for the domestic cups, and for the sake of practicality, only the modern eras of the two domestic cup trophies (since 1995 for the U.S. Open Cup and since the inception of the Canadian Championship in 2008) are included in this particular chart. For full domestic cup histories and totals, see below.
- ^Note 9 – The current incarnation of the franchise is a namesake phoenix club that owns the rights to the club's name and history.
- ^Note 10 – Team currently exists as a professional franchise in a Division II or Division III league, and as such are prevented from competing for two of the three domestic majors due to a lack of promotion and relegation.
- ^Note 11 – The current incarnation of the franchise rebranded but owns the rights to the club's name and history.
- ^Note 12 – Canadian soccer team.

== Minor titles ==
=== Division 2 leagues ===
Before the 1976 season, the American Soccer League placed its first teams on the west coast, going national. For the first time, the United States and Canada had a national-level second-division league. For 2017 the USSF granted provisional D2 status for both the NASL and the USL.

Year	Champions	Runners-up	Regular season	Runners-up
1976	Los Angeles Skyhawks	New York Apollo	Los Angeles Skyhawks	Tacoma Tides
1977	New Jersey Americans	Sacramento Spirits	New Jersey Americans	Sacramento Spirits
1978	New York Apollo	Los Angeles Skyhawks	New York Apollo	Los Angeles Skyhawks
1979	Sacramento Gold	Columbus Magic	California Sunshine	Columbus Magic
1980	Pennsylvania Stoners	Sacramento Spirit	Pennsylvania Stoners	New York United
1981	Carolina Lightnin'	New York United	New York United	Pennsylvania Stoners
1982	Detroit Express	Oklahoma City Slickers	Detroit Express	Oklahoma City Slickers
1983	Jacksonville Tea Men	Pennsylvania Stoners	Jacksonville Tea Men	Dallas Americans
1984	Fort Lauderdale Sun	Houston Dynamos	Oklahoma City Stampede	Fort Lauderdale Sun
1985	South Florida Sun (2)	Dallas Americans	South Florida Sun	Dallas Americans
1986	no USSF sanctioned Division 2 league			
1987	no USSF sanctioned Division 2 league			
1988	Washington Diplomats	Fort Lauderdale Strikers	New Jersey Eagles	Fort Lauderdale Strikers
1989	Fort Lauderdale Strikers^{13}	San Diego Nomads^{13}	Washington Stars	Boston Bolts
1990	Maryland Bays	San Francisco Bay Blackhawks	Fort Lauderdale Strikers	Maryland Bays
1991	San Francisco Bay Blackhawks	Albany Capitals	Maryland Bays	San Francisco Bay Blackhawks
1992	Colorado Foxes	Tampa Bay Rowdies	Colorado Foxes	Tampa Bay Rowdies
1993	Colorado Foxes (2)	Los Angeles Salsa	Vancouver 86ers	Colorado Foxes
1994	Montreal Impact	Colorado Foxes	Seattle Sounders	Los Angeles Salsa
1995	Seattle Sounders	Atlanta Ruckus	Montreal Impact	Seattle Sounders
1996 (AL, SL)	AL: Seattle Sounders (2); SL: California Jaguars	AL: Rochester Rhinos; SL: Richmond Kickers	AL: Montreal Impact (2); SL: Carolina Dynamo	AL: Colorado Foxes; SL: California Jaguars
1997	Milwaukee Rampage	Carolina Dynamo	Montreal Impact (3)	Hershey Wildcats
1998	Rochester Rhinos	Minnesota Thunder	Rochester Rhinos	San Diego Flash
1999	Minnesota Thunder	Rochester Rhinos	Rochester Rhinos (2)	San Diego Flash
2000	Rochester Rhinos (2)	Minnesota Thunder	Minnesota Thunder	Milwaukee Rampage
2001	Rochester Rhinos (3)	Hershey Wildcats	Richmond Kickers	Hershey Wildcats
2002	Milwaukee Rampage (2)	Richmond Kickers	Seattle Sounders (2)	Charleston Battery
2003	Charleston Battery	Minnesota Thunder	Milwaukee Wave United	Montreal Impact
2004	Montreal Impact (2)	Seattle Sounders	Portland Timbers	Montreal Impact
2005	Seattle Sounders (3)	Richmond Kickers	Montreal Impact (4)	Rochester Rhinos
2006	Vancouver Whitecaps (5)	Rochester Rhinos	Montreal Impact (5)	Rochester Rhinos
2007	Seattle Sounders (4)	Atlanta Silverbacks	Seattle Sounders (3)	Portland Timbers
2008	Vancouver Whitecaps (6)	Puerto Rico Islanders	Puerto Rico Islanders	Vancouver Whitecaps
2009	Montreal Impact (3)	Vancouver Whitecaps	Portland Timbers (2)	Carolina RailHawks
2010	Puerto Rico Islanders	Carolina RailHawks	Rochester Rhinos (3)	Carolina RailHawks
2011	Minnesota Stars	Fort Lauderdale Strikers	Carolina RailHawks	Puerto Rico Islanders
2012	Tampa Bay Rowdies	Minnesota Stars	San Antonio Scorpions	Tampa Bay Rowdies
2013	New York Cosmos	Atlanta Silverbacks	Carolina RailHawks (2)	Tampa Bay Rowdies
2014	San Antonio Scorpions	Fort Lauderdale Strikers	Minnesota United FC	San Antonio Scorpions
2015	New York Cosmos (2)	Ottawa Fury FC	New York Cosmos	Ottawa Fury FC
2016	New York Cosmos (3)	Indy Eleven	New York Cosmos (2)	Indy Eleven
2017 (NASL, USL)	NASL: San Francisco Deltas; USL: Louisville City FC	NASL: New York Cosmos; USL: Swope Park Rangers	NASL: Miami FC; USL: Real Monarchs	NASL: San Francisco Deltas; USL: Louisville City FC
2018	Louisville City FC (2)	Phoenix Rising FC	FC Cincinnati	Orange County SC
2019	Real Monarchs	Louisville City FC	Phoenix Rising FC	Pittsburgh Riverhounds SC
2020	championship final canceled		Reno 1868 FC	Phoenix Rising FC
2021	Orange County SC	Tampa Bay Rowdies	Tampa Bay Rowdies	Phoenix Rising FC
2022	San Antonio FC	Louisville City FC	San Antonio FC	Louisville City FC
2023	Phoenix Rising FC	Charleston Battery	Pittsburgh Riverhounds SC	Sacramento Republic FC
2024	Colorado Springs Switchbacks FC	Rhode Island FC	Louisville City FC	Charleston Battery
2025	Pittsburgh Riverhounds SC	FC Tulsa	Louisville City FC (2)	Charleston Battery
2026			Tampa Bay Rowdies (2)	Charleston Battery

- ^Note 13 – In 1989 the two largest U.S. leagues, the American Soccer League and the Western Soccer League, played a title game between their respective postseason champions as a precursor to the next season's merger.

=== Division 3 leagues ===
Year	Champions	Runners-up	Regular season	Runners-up
1991	Richardson Rockets	New Mexico Chiles	Memphis Rogues	Richardson Rockets
1992	Palo Alto Firebirds	Tucson Amigos	Dallas Rockets	El Paso Patriots
1993	Greensboro Dynamo	Orlando Lions	Orlando Lions	San Jose Hawks
1994	Greensboro Dynamo (2)	Minnesota Thunder	Minnesota Thunder	Milwaukee Rampage
1995	Long Island Rough Riders	Minnesota Thunder	Minnesota Thunder (2)	Long Island Rough Riders
1996	Charleston Battery	Charlotte Eagles	Charlotte Eagles	Central Jersey Riptide
1997	Albuquerque Geckos	Charlotte Eagles	Myrtle Beach Seadawgs	Albuquerque Geckos
1998	Chicago Stingers	New Hampshire Phantoms	Miami Breakers	Indiana Blast
1999	Western Mass Pioneers	South Jersey Barons	Chico Rooks	Texas Toros
2000	Charlotte Eagles	New Jersey Stallions	New Jersey Stallions	Texas Rattlers
2001	Utah Blitzz	Greenville Lions	Utah Blitzz	Chico Rooks
2002	Long Island Rough Riders (2)	Wilmington Hammerheads	Utah Blitzz (2)	Wilmington Hammerheads
2003	Wilmington Hammerheads	Westchester Flames	Carolina Dynamo	Long Island Rough Riders
2004	Utah Blitzz (2)	Charlotte Eagles	Pittsburgh Riverhounds	Charlotte Eagles
2005	Charlotte Eagles (2)	Western Mass Pioneers	Western Mass Pioneers	Charlotte Eagles
2006	Richmond Kickers	Charlotte Eagles	Richmond Kickers	Charlotte Eagles
2007	Harrisburg City Islanders	Richmond Kickers	Richmond Kickers (2)	Cleveland City Stars
2008	Cleveland City Stars	Charlotte Eagles	Charlotte Eagles (2)	Richmond Kickers
2009	Richmond Kickers (2)	Charlotte Eagles	Wilmington Hammerheads	Richmond Kickers
2010	Charleston Battery (2)	Richmond Kickers	Charleston Battery	Richmond Kickers
2011	Orlando City	Harrisburg City Islanders	Orlando City	Wilmington Hammerheads
2012	Charleston Battery (3)	Wilmington Hammerheads	Orlando City (2)	Rochester Rhinos
2013	Orlando City (2)	Charlotte Eagles	Richmond Kickers (3)	Orlando City
2014	Sacramento Republic	Harrisburg City Islanders	Orlando City (3)	Sacramento Republic
2015	Rochester Rhinos	LA Galaxy II	Rochester Rhinos	Louisville City FC
2016	New York Red Bulls II	Swope Park Rangers	New York Red Bulls II	Louisville City FC
2017	no USSF sanctioned Division 3 league			
2018	no USSF sanctioned Division 3 league			
USL1: 2019	North Texas SC	Greenville Triumph SC	North Texas SC	Lansing Ignite FC
NISA: 2019–20 Fall; NISA: 2019–20 Spring	no overall association champion decided^{14}			
NISA: 2019–20 Fall; NISA: 2019–20 Spring	season not complete due to COVID-19 pandemic			
USL1: 2020	Greenville Triumph SC	Union Omaha	Greenville Triumph SC	Union Omaha
NISA: 2020–21 Fall; NISA: 2020–21 Spring	Detroit City FC	Los Angeles Force	Fall: Detroit City FC; Spring: Los Angeles Force	Fall: Oakland Roots SC; Spring: Chattanooga FC
USL1: 2021; NISA: 2021	USL1: Union Omaha; NISA: Detroit City FC (2)	USL1: Greenville Triumph SC; NISA: California United Strikers FC	USL1: Union Omaha; NISA: Detroit City FC (2)	USL1: Greenville Triumph SC; NISA: California United Strikers FC
USL1: 2022; NISA: 2022; MLSNP: 2022	USL1: Tormenta FC; NISA: Michigan Stars FC; MLSNP: Columbus Crew 2	USL1: Chattanooga Red Wolves SC; NISA: Albion San Diego; MLSNP: St. Louis City SC 2	USL1: Richmond Kickers (4); NISA: California United Strikers FC; MLSNP: Columbus Crew 2	USL1: Greenville Triumph SC; NISA: Chattanooga FC; MLSNP: St. Louis City SC 2
USL1: 2023; NISA: 2023; MLSNP: 2023	USL1: North Carolina FC; NISA: Flower City Union; MLSNP: Austin FC II	USL1: Charlotte Independence; NISA: Michigan Stars FC; MLSNP: Columbus Crew 2	USL1: Union Omaha (2); NISA: Chattanooga FC; MLSNP: Colorado Rapids 2	USL1: North Carolina FC; NISA: Michigan Stars FC; MLSNP: Crown Legacy FC
USL1: 2024; NISA: 2024; MLSNP: 2024	USL1: Union Omaha (2); NISA: Los Angeles Force; MLSNP:North Texas SC	USL1: Spokane Velocity; NISA: Irvine Zeta FC; MLSNP:Philadelphia Union II	USL1: Union Omaha (3); NISA: Maryland Bobcats; MLSNP: North Texas SC	USL1: Northern Colorado Hailstorm FC; NISA: Los Angeles Force; MLSNP: St. Louis City 2
USL1: 2025; MLSNP: 2025	USL1: One Knoxville SC; MLSNP:New York Red Bulls II	USL1: Spokane Velocity; MLSNP:Colorado Rapids 2	USL1: One Knoxville SC; MLSNP: St. Louis City 2	USL1: Chattanooga Red Wolves SC; MLSNP: New York Red Bulls II
USL1: 2026; MLSNP: 2026	USL1: Charlotte Independence; MLSNP:Chattanooga FC	USL1: Athletic Club Boise; MLSNP:Los Angeles FC 2	USL1: Charlotte Independence; MLSNP: Austin FC II	USL1: Union Omaha; MLSNP: Crown Legacy FC

- ^Note 14 – The "Fall Showcase" had both NISA conferences compete in separate championship games with both winners automatically qualifying for the Spring 2020 playoffs. Miami FC and California United Strikers FC won the East Coast Conference and West Coast Conference respectively.

== Other titles ==
=== American Cup (1885–1924) ===
Year	Winner	Runner-up
1885	Clark O.N.T.	New York
1886	Clark O.N.T.	Kearny Rangers
1887	Clark O.N.T.	Kearny Rangers
1888	Fall River Rovers	Newark Almas
1889	Fall River Rovers	Newark Caledonians
1890	Fall River Olympics	Kearny Rovers
1891	Fall River East Ends	Brooklyn Longfellows
1892	Fall River East Ends	New York Thistle
1893	Pawtucket Free Wanderers	New York Thistle
1894	Fall River Olympics	Paterson True Blues
1895	Newark Caledonian	Pawtucket Free Wanderers
1896	Paterson True Blues	Fall River Olympics
1897	Philadelphia Manz	Paterson True Blues
1898	Arlington A.A.	Kearny A.C.
1899–1905	no competition	
1906	West Hudson A.A.	Paterson True Blues
1907	Clark A.A.	Kearny Scots
1908	West Hudson A.A.	Paterson True Blues
1909	Paterson True Blues	East Newark Clark A.A.
1910	Disston A.A.	Kearny Scots
1911	Howard & Bullough	Philadelphia Hibernian
1912	West Hudson A.A.	Paterson Rangers
1913	Paterson True Blues	Disston A.A.
1914	Bethlehem Steel F.C.	Disston A.A.
1915	Kearny Scots	Brooklyn Celtic
1916	Bethlehem Steel F.C.	Kearny Scots
1917	Bethlehem Steel F.C.	West Hudson A.A.
1918	Bethlehem Steel F.C.	Babcock & Wilcox
1919	Bethlehem Steel F.C.	Paterson F.C.
1920	Brooklyn Robins Dry Dock	Bethlehem Steel F.C.
1921	Brooklyn Robins Dry Dock	Fore River
1922	no competition	
1923	Fleisher Yarn	J&P Coats
1924	Bethlehem Steel F.C.	Fall River F.C.

=== American League of Professional Football (1894–95) ===
Year	Winner	Runners-up
1894–95	Brooklyn Bridegrooms	Baltimore Orioles F.C.

=== National Association Football League (1895–1921) ===
Year	Winner	Runners-up
1895	Centreville A.C.	Kearny Scots
1895–96	no records exist	
1896–97	Centreville A.C.	Brooklyn Wanderers
1897–98	Paterson True Blues	Kearny Scots
1898–99	Paterson True Blues	Kearny Arlington
1906–07	West Hudson A.A.	Kearny Scots
1907–08	Newark FC	Paterson Rangers
1908–09	East Newark Clark A.A. West Hudson A.A.^{15}	
1909–10	West Hudson A.A.	Jersey A.C.
1910–11	Jersey A.C.	Paterson Wilberforce
1911–12	West Hudson A.A.	Paterson Wilberforce
1912–13	West Hudson A.A.	Paterson True Blues
1913–14	Brooklyn F.C.	West Hudson A.A.
1914–15	West Hudson A.A.	Jersey A.C.
1915–16	Harrison Alley Boys	Kearny Scots
1916–17	Jersey A.C.	Kearny Scots
1917–18	Paterson F.C.	Bethlehem Steel F.C.
1918–19	Bethlehem Steel F.C.	Philadelphia Merchant Ship
1919–20	Bethlehem Steel F.C.	Erie A.A.
1920–21	Bethlehem Steel F.C.	New York F.C.

- ^Note 15 – East Newark Clark and West Hudson finished tied and were declared co-champions.

=== American Soccer League I (1921–1933) ===
The American Soccer League was the most prominent soccer league in the United States during the early 20th century. Some modern sources consider it to have been a major professional league.

Year	Winner (tot)	Runners-up	Leading goalscorer(s)
1921–22	Philadelphia F.C.	New York F.C.	Harold Brittan
1922–23	J. & P. Coats F.C.	Bethlehem Steel F.C.	Daniel McNiven
1923–24	Fall River F.C.	Bethlehem Steel	Archie Stark
1924–25	Fall River F.C. (2)	Bethlehem Steel	Archie Stark
1925–26	Fall River F.C. (3)	New Bedford Whalers	Andy Stevens
1926–27	Bethlehem Steel	Boston S.C.	Davey Brown
1927–28	Boston S.C.	New Bedford Whalers	Andy Stevens
1928–29	Fall River F.C. (4)	Brooklyn Wanderers	Werner Nilsen; János Nehadoma
1929	Fall River F.C. (5)	Providence F.C.	Bill Paterson
1930	Fall River F.C. (6)	New Bedford Whalers	Jerry Best
1931	New York Giants	New Bedford Whalers	Bob McIntyre
1932	New Bedford Whalers	Hakoah All-Stars	Bert Patenaude
1932–33	Fall River F.C.	Pawtucket Rangers	

=== American Soccer League II (1933–1975) ===
Year	Winner (tot)	Runners-up	Leading goalscorer(s)	MVP
1933–34	Kearny Irish (1)	New York Americans	Archie Stark; Razzo Carroll	not awarded
1934–35	Philadelphia German-Americans (1)	New York Americans	Millard Lang	not awarded
1935–36	New York Americans (1)	Baltimore Canton	Alex Rae	not awarded
1936–37	Kearny Scots (1)	Brooklyn Hispano	Charlie Ernst	not awarded
1937–38	Kearny Scots (2)	Brooklyn St. Mary's Celtic	Fabri Salcedo	not awarded
1938–39	Kearny Scots (3)	Philadelphia German-Americans	Bert Patenaude	not awarded
1939–40	Kearny Scots (4)	Baltimore S.C.	Charlie Ernst	not awarded
1940–41	Kearny Scots (5)	Philadelphia German-Americans	Fabri Salcedo	not awarded
1941–42	Philadelphia Americans (2)	Brookhattan	John Nanoski	not awarded
1942–43	Brooklyn Hispano (1)	Brookhattan	Chappie Sheppell	not awarded
1943–44	Philadelphia Americans (3)	Brooklyn Wanderers	Tommy Marshall	not awarded
1944–45	Brookhattan (1)	Philadelphia Americans	John Nanoski	Steve Rozbora
1945–46	Baltimore Americans (1)	Brooklyn Hispano	Fabri Salcedo	Ray McFaul
1946–47	Philadelphia Americans (4)	Brooklyn Wanderers	Bill Fisher	Servile Mervine
1947–48	Philadelphia Americans (5)	Kearny Scots	Nicholas Kropfelder	John O'Connell
1948–49	Philadelphia Nationals (1)	New York Americans	Pito Villanon	John O'Connell
1949–50	Philadelphia Nationals (2)	Kearny Celtic	Joe Gaetjens	Joe Maca
1950–51	Philadelphia Nationals (3)	Kearny Celtic	Nicholas Kropfelder	John Donald
1951–52	Philadelphia Americans (6)	Kearny Scots	Dick Roberts	Benny McLaughlin
1952–53	Philadelphia Nationals (4)	Newark Portuguese	Pito Villanon	Pito Villanon
1953–54	New York Americans (2)	Brookhattan	Jack Calder	Cyril Hannaby
1954–55	Uhrik Truckers (7)	Brooklyn Hispano	John Ferris	John Ferris
1955–56	Uhrik Truckers (8)	Elizabeth Falcons	Gene Grabowski	Jack Hynes
1956–57	New York Hakoah-Americans (1)	Uhrik Truckers	George Brown	John Oliver
1957–58	New York Hakoah-Americans (2)	Ukrainian Nationals	Lloyd Monsen	Walter Kudenko
1958–59	New York Hakoah-Americans (3)	Ukrainian Nationals	Pasquale Pepe	Yuriy Kulishenko
1959–60	Colombo (1)	New York Hakoah	Mike Noha	Andy Racz
1960–61	Ukrainian Nationals (1)	Falcons S.C.	Herman Niss	Mike Noha
1961–62	Ukrainian Nationals (2)	Inter-Brooklyn Italians	Peter Millar	Peter Millar
1962–63	Ukrainian Nationals (3)	Inter S.C.	Ismael Ferreyra	Peter Millar
1963–64	Ukrainian Nationals (4)	Boston Metros	Walter Chyzowych	Abbie Wolanow
1964–65	Hartford S.C (1)	Newark Portuguese	Herculiano Riguerdo	Alberto Falak
1965–66	Roma S.C. (1)	Newark Ukrainian Sitch	Walter Chyzowych	Walter Chyzowych
1966–67	Baltimore St. Gerards (1)	Newark Ukrainian Sitch	Jorge Benitez	Myron Worobec
1967–68	Ukrainian Nationals (5)	New York Inter	Ivan Paleto	Robert Waugh
1968	Washington Darts (1)	Rochester Lancers	Gerry Browne	
1969	Washington Darts (2)	Syracuse Scorpions	Jim Lefkos	Robert Waugh
1970	Philadelphia Ukrainians (6)	Philadelphia Spartans	Juan Paletta; Willie Mfum	Albert Trik
1971	New York Greeks (1)	Boston Astros	Charles Duccilli	Bob Hatzos
1972	Cincinnati Comets (1)	New York Greeks	Charles Duccilli	Ringo Cantillo
1973	New York Apollo (2)	Cincinnati Comets	Eddy Roberts	Helio Barbosa
1974	Rhode Island Oceaneers (1)	New York Apollo	Ringo Cantillo	Ringo Cantillo
1975	New York Apollo (3), Boston Astros (1)	co-champions	José Neto	José Neto

=== St. Louis Soccer League (1907–1939) ===
Year	Winner
1907–08	Innisfails
1908–09	St. Leo's
1909–10	St. Leo's
1910–11	St. Leo's
1911–12	St. Leo's
1912–13	St. Leo's
1913–14	St. Leo's
1914–15	St. Leo's
1915–16	Ben Millers
1916–17	Ben Millers
1917–18	Ben Millers
1918–19	Scullin Steel
1919–20	Ben Millers
1920–21	Scullin Steel
1921–22	Scullin Steel
1922–23	Vesper Buick
1923–24	Vesper Buick
1924–25	Ben Millers
1925–26	Ben Millers
1926–27	Ben Millers
1927–28	Tablers
1928–29	Tablers
1929–30	Tablers
1930–31	Coca-Colas
1931–32	Coca-Colas
1932–33	Stix, Baer and Fuller F.C.
1933–34	Stix, Baer and Fuller F.C.
1934–35	St. Louis Central Breweries F.C.
1935–36	Burke's Undertakers
1936–37	Burke's Undertakers
1937–38	St. Matthew's
1938–39	Chicago Sparta

=== Lewis Cup (1915–1963) ===
The Lewis Cup was an American soccer trophy originally given to the champion of the Blue Mountain League of northwestern Pennsylvania and later awarded to the winners of the American Soccer League's League Cup.

Year	Winner	Runner-up
1915	Bethlehem Reserves	Nativity Men's Club
1916	Allentown YMCA	–
1917	Allentown YMCA (2)	Nativity Men's Club
1918	North End F.C.	Victor F.C.
1919	North End F.C. (2)	Saucon Cross Roads
1920–1924	no competition	
1925	Boston Soccer Club	Fall River F.C.
1926	New Bedford Whalers	New York Giants
1927	Boston Soccer Club (2)	Brooklyn Wanderers
1928	Bethlehem Steel	Boston Soccer Club
1929	New York Nationals	New Bedford Whalers
1930	Fall River F.C.	Hakoah All-Stars
1931–1939	no competition	
1940	Kearny Scots	Philadelphia German American
1941	Philadelphia German-American	Brookhattan
1942	Brookhattan	Kearny Irish
1943	Philadelphia Americans (2)	Kearny Irish
1944	Kearny Irish	Brooklyn Wanderers
1945	Brookhattan (2)	Brooklyn Wanderers
1946	Brooklyn Hispano	Baltimore Americans
1947	Baltimore Americans	Kearny Irish
1948	Kearny Scots (2)	Brookhattan
1949	Philadelphia Nationals	Kearny Irish
1950	New York Americans	Philadelphia Nationals
1951	Philadelphia Nationals (2)	New York Hakoah
1952	Philadelphia Nationals (3)	New York Americans
1953	Newark Portuguese	Philadelphia Nationals
1954	Newark Sport Club	S.C. Eintracht
1955	Uhrik Truckers (3)	Brookhattan
1956	no competition	
1957	Elizabeth Falcons	Newark Portuguese
1958	Uhrik Truckers (4)	Ukrainian Nationals
1959	Ukrainian Nationals	New York Hakoah
1960–1962	no competition	
1963	Newark Ukrainian Sitch	Ukrainian Nationals

=== Western Soccer Alliance / Lone Star Soccer Alliance / American Soccer League III (1985–1992) ===
- In 1985, several independent teams on the west coast formed the Western Soccer Alliance. Dedicated to fiscal austerity, it succeeded where the United Soccer League, founded the year before, failed. In 1987, the Lone Star Soccer Alliance imitated the success of the WSA in creating a viable regional league. In 1988, the third version of the American Soccer League, was established as a regional, east-coast league.

Western Soccer Alliance
Year	Winner (tot)	Runners-up	Leading goalscorer(s)
1985	San Jose Earthquakes (1)	Victoria Riptides	
1986	Hollywood Kickers (1)	F.C. Portland	Brent Goulet
1987	San Diego Nomads (1)	F.C. Seattle	Joe Mihaljevic
1988	F.C. Seattle Storm (1)	San Diego Nomads	Scott Benedetti
1989	San Diego Nomads (2)	San Francisco Bay Blackhawks	Steve Corpening

Lone Star Soccer Alliance
Year	Winner (tot)	Runners-up	Leading goalscorer(s)
1987	Dallas Express (1)	Houston Dynamos	
1988	Dallas Mean Green (2)	Houston Dynamos	
1989	Austin Thunder (1)	F.C. Dallas	
1990	Oklahoma City Spirit (1)	F.C. Dallas	
1991	F.C. Dallas (3)	Austin Thunder	Louis Morales
1992	Dallas Inter (4)	America F.C.	David Gordon

American Soccer League III
Year	Winner (tot)	Runners-up	Leading goalscorer(s)
1988	Washington Diplomats (1)	Fort Lauderdale Strikers	Jorge Acosta
1989	Fort Lauderdale Strikers (1)	Boston Bolts	Ricardo Alonso; Mirko Castillo

== Women's titles ==
=== Women's D1 Leagues ===
==== Women's United Soccer Association (2001–2003) ====
Year	Champions	Runners-up	Regular season	Runners-up	Leading goalscorer(s)	Goals
2001	Bay Area CyberRays	Atlanta Beat	Atlanta Beat	Bay Area CyberRays	Tiffeny Milbrett (New York Power)	16
2002	Carolina Courage	Washington Freedom	Carolina Courage	Philadelphia Charge	Kátia (San Jose CyberRays)	15
2003	Washington Freedom	Atlanta Beat	Boston Breakers	Atlanta Beat	Marinette Pichon (Philadelphia Charge); Dagny Mellgren (Boston Breakers)	14

==== Women's Professional Soccer (2009–2011) ====
Year	Champions	Runners-up	Regular season	Runners-up	Leading goalscorer(s)	Goals
2009	Sky Blue FC	Los Angeles Sol	Los Angeles Sol	St. Louis Athletica	Marta (Los Angeles Sol)	9
2010	FC Gold Pride	Philadelphia Independence	FC Gold Pride	Boston Breakers	Marta (FC Gold Pride)	19
2011	Western New York Flash	Philadelphia Independence	Western New York Flash	Philadelphia Independence	Christine Sinclair (Western New York Flash); Marta (Western New York Flash)	10

==== National Women's Soccer League (2013–present) ====
Year	Champions	Runners-up	Regular season	Runners-up	Leading goalscorer(s)	Goals
2013	Portland Thorns	Western New York Flash	Western New York Flash (2)	FC Kansas City	Lauren Holiday (FC Kansas City)	12
2014	FC Kansas City	Seattle Reign FC	Seattle Reign FC	FC Kansas City	Kim Little (Seattle Reign FC)	16
2015	FC Kansas City (2)	Seattle Reign FC	Seattle Reign FC (2)	Chicago Red Stars	Crystal Dunn (Washington Spirit)	15
2016	Western New York Flash (2)	Washington Spirit	Portland Thorns	Washington Spirit	Kealia Ohai (Houston Dash); Lynn Williams (Western New York Flash)	11
2017	Portland Thorns (2)	North Carolina Courage	North Carolina Courage	Portland Thorns	Sam Kerr (Sky Blue FC)	17
2018	North Carolina Courage	Portland Thorns	North Carolina Courage (2)	Portland Thorns	Sam Kerr (Chicago Red Stars)	16
2019	North Carolina Courage (2)	Chicago Red Stars	North Carolina Courage (3)	Chicago Red Stars	Sam Kerr (Chicago Red Stars)	18
2020	canceled due to COVID-19 pandemic					
2021	Washington Spirit	Chicago Red Stars	Portland Thorns (2)	OL Reign	Ashley Hatch (Washington Spirit)	10
2022	Portland Thorns (3)	Kansas City Current	OL Reign (3)	Portland Thorns	Alex Morgan (San Diego Wave FC)	15
2023	NJ/NY Gotham FC (2)	OL Reign	San Diego Wave FC	Portland Thorns	Sophia Smith (Portland Thorns)	11
2024	Orlando Pride	Washington Spirit	Orlando Pride	Washington Spirit	Temwa Chawinga (Kansas City Current)	20
2025	Gotham FC (3)	Washington Spirit	Kansas City Current	Washington Spirit	Temwa Chawinga (Kansas City Current)	15

==== USL Super League (2024–present) ====
Year	Champions	Runners-up	Regular season	Runners-up	Leading goalscorer(s)	Goals
2024–25	Tampa Bay Sun FC	Fort Lauderdale United FC	Carolina Ascent FC	Tampa Bay Sun FC	Allie Thornton (Dallas Trinity FC)	13
2025–26	Lexington SC	Carolina Ascent FC	Lexington SC	Sporting Club Jacksonville	Ashlyn Puerta (Sporting Club Jacksonville)	11

=== Women's National Championships ===
==== Amateur era ====
Year	Winner
1980	Seattle Sharks
1981	Romiosa F.C.
1982	F.C. Lowenbrau
1983	Michelob Ladies
1984	Chapel Hill Kix
1985	Michelob Ladies (2)
1986	Fairfax Wildfire
1987	Michelob Ladies (3)
1988	California Tremors
1989	Michelob Ladies (4)
1990	Opus County S.C.
1991	Texas Challenge
1992	Ajax America
1993	Ajax America (2)
1994	Sacramento Storm
1995	Sacramento Storm (2)

==== Modern era ====
Year	Winner	Score	Runner-up
1996	Dallas Lightning	2–1	Sacramento Storm
1997	Dallas Lightning (2)	(Note: Sources disagree on winner)	Sacramento Storm
1998	Ajax America (3)	5–0	Dallas Lightning
1999	Auto Trader San Diego	14–0	Patrick Real Wyckoff
2000	Ajax America (4)	2–1	Detroit Rocker Hawks
2001	Detroit Rocker Hawks	1–0	SoCal Blues
2002	SoCal Blues	5–0	Peninsula Aztecs
2003	Ajax America (5)	(Note: Losing finalist and semi-finalists unknown)	
2004	Ajax America (6)	2–1	Detroit Jaguars
2005	FC Indiana	4–0	DCS Titans
2006	Dallas Roma F.C.		
2007	Ajax America (7)	2–1	FC Indiana
2008	FC Indiana (2)	(Note: All semi-finalists known but results are not)	
2009	Chicago Eclipse Select	3–1	NYAC
2010	NYAC	2–0 (OT)	Dallas Premier
2011	J.B. Marine S.C.	2–1 (OT)	Sparta United WSC
2012	Chicago Red Stars	3–2	NYAC
2013	Houston Aces	(Note: Group format used)	Kansas City Dynamos
2014	NYAC	2–1	ASA Chesapeake Charge
2015	Olympic Club		ASA Chesapeake Charge
2016	Olympic Club	2–0	United FC

==== Amateur Open era ====
Year	Winner
2023	NTX Image
2024	Pan World Elite (UT)
2025	Pan World Elite (UT) (2)
2026	Rochester Lazers

==== League Cup & Super Cup ====
Year	Winners	Score	Runners-up	Venue	Attendance	Player of the Final	Tournament MVP
2020	Houston Dash	2–0	Chicago Red Stars	Rio Tinto Stadium	0 (behind closed doors)	Shea Groom (Houston Dash)	Rachel Daly (Houston Dash)
2021	Portland Thorns FC	1–1; 6–5 (p)	NJ/NY Gotham FC	Providence Park	4,000 - 5,000 (estimate)	Adrianna Franch (Portland Thorns FC)	Debinha (North Carolina Courage)
2022	North Carolina Courage	2–1	Washington Spirit	Sahlen's Stadium	3,163	Kerolin (North Carolina Courage)	Debinha (North Carolina Courage)
2023	North Carolina Courage (2)	2–0	Racing Louisville FC	Sahlen's Stadium	3,068	Manaka Matsukubo (North Carolina Courage)	Kristen Hamilton (Kansas City Current)
2024	San Diego Wave FC	1–0	NJ/NY Gotham FC	Red Bull Arena	14,241	Alex Morgan (San Diego Wave FC)	not awarded
2025	Washington Spirit	1–1; 4–2 (p)	Orlando Pride	Inter&Co Stadium	8,880	Aubrey Kingsbury (Washington Spirit)	not awarded
2026	Gotham FC	2–0	Kansas City Current	ScottsMiracle-Gro Field	TBA		

=== Overall totals ===
As of June 26, 2026

Defunct franchises: †.

Team^{16}	D1 League Championship	D1 Regular Season	Domestic Cup	Continental Championship	Total	Last Major
North Carolina Courage	2	3	2	0	7	2023 DC
Portland Thorns FC	3	2	1	0	6	2022 LC
Gotham FC	3	0	1	1	5	2026 DC
Western New York Flash †	2	2	0	0	4	2016 LC
Seattle Reign FC	0	3	0	0	3	2022 RS
FC Kansas City †	2	0	0	0	2	2015 LC
Lexington SC	1	1	0	0	2	2026 LC
Orlando Pride	1	1	0	0	2	2024 LC
FC Gold Pride †	1	1	0	0	2	2010 LC
Carolina Courage †	1	1	0	0	2	2002 LC
Washington Spirit	1	0	1	0	2	2025 DC
San Diego Wave FC	0	1	1	0	2	2024 DC
Tampa Bay Sun FC	1	0	0	0	1	2025 LC
Washington Freedom †	1	0	0	0	1	2003 LC
San Jose CyberRays †	1	0	0	0	1	2001 LC
Kansas City Current	0	1	0	0	1	2025 RS
Carolina Ascent FC	0	1	0	0	1	2025 RS
Los Angeles Sol †	0	1	0	0	1	2009 RS
Boston Breakers †	0	1	0	0	1	2003 RS
Atlanta Beat †	0	1	0	0	1	2001 RS
Houston Dash	0	0	1	0	1	2020 DC
Chicago Stars FC	0	0	1	0	1	2012 DC

- ^Note 16 – Only the teams from the four women's D1 leagues are listed.

=== Canadian Women's D3 National Championships ===
Year	Winner	Score	Runner-up	Location
2022	A.S. Blainville	3–0	AS Laval	Laval, Quebec
2023	Whitecaps FC Girls Elite	5–0	PEF Québec	Langley Township, British Columbia
2024	Whitecaps FC Girls Elite (2)	2–2 (3–2)	CS Mont-Royal Outremont	Hamilton, Ontario
2025	Simcoe County Rovers FC	2–0	CS Mont-Royal Outremont	Sherwood Park, Alberta

=== Multiple majors in one season ===
==== Doubles ====
Year	Club (number of doubles)	Honors
2002	Carolina Courage	WUSA regular season, WUSA Champions
2010	FC Gold Pride	WPS regular season, WPS Champions
2011	Western New York Flash	WPS regular season, WPS Champions
2018	North Carolina Courage	NWSL Shield, NWSL Champions
2019	North Carolina Courage (2)	NWSL Shield, NWSL Champions
2024	Orlando Pride	NWSL Shield, NWSL Champions
2025	Gotham FC	CONCACAF W Champions Cup, NWSL Champions
2026	Lexington SC	USLSL Shield, USLSL Champions

== Indoor titles ==
=== North American Soccer League (1971, 1975–76, 1978–84) ===
Year	Type	Winner (tot)	Runners-up	Leading goalscorer(s)	Goals
1971	4-team tournament	Dallas Tornado (1)	Rochester Lancers	Mike Renshaw; Jim Benedek; Dragan Popović	2
1975	16-team tournament	San Jose Earthquakes (1)	Tampa Bay Rowdies	Paul Child	14
1976	12-team tournament	Tampa Bay Rowdies (1)	Rochester Lancers	Julie Veee	8
1978 Skelly	4-team tournament	Tulsa Roughnecks (1)	Minnesota Kicks	Nino Zec; Randy Garber; Milan Dovedan	5
1978 Schlitz	4-team tournament	Dallas Tornado (2)	Houston Hurricane	Peter Anderson; Kai Haaskivi	6
1979	4-team tournament	Dallas Tornado (3)	Tampa Bay Rowdies	Jim Ryan	7
1979–80	12-game season	Tampa Bay Rowdies (2)	Memphis Rogues	David Byrne	23
1980–81	18-game season	Edmonton Drillers (1)	Chicago Sting	Karl-Heinz Granitza	42
1981–82	18-game season	San Diego Sockers (1)	Tampa Bay Rowdies	Juli Veee	51
1983	4-team grand prix	Tampa Bay Rowdies (3)	Montreal Manic	Laurie Abrahams; Dale Mitchell	12
1983–84	32-game season	San Diego Sockers (2)	New York Cosmos	Steve Zungul	63

=== Major Indoor Soccer League I/Major Soccer League (1978–1992) ===
Year	Winner (tot)	Runners-up	Leading goalscorer(s)
1978–79	New York Arrows (1)	Philadelphia Fever	Fred Grgurev
1979–80	New York Arrows (2)	Houston Summit	Steve Zungul
1980–81	New York Arrows (3)	St. Louis Steamers	Steve Zungul
1981–82	New York Arrows (4)	St. Louis Steamers	Steve Zungul
1982–83	San Diego Sockers (3)	Baltimore Blast I	Steve Zungul
1983–84	Baltimore Blast I (1)	St. Louis Steamers	Mark Liveric
1984–85	San Diego Sockers (4)	Baltimore Blast I	Steve Zungul
1985–86	San Diego Sockers (5)	Minnesota Strikers	Erik Rasmussen
1986–87	Dallas Sidekicks (1)	Tacoma Stars	Tatu
1987–88	San Diego Sockers (6)	Cleveland Force	Hector Marinaro
1988–89	San Diego Sockers (7)	Baltimore Blast I	Preki
1989–90	San Diego Sockers (8)	Baltimore Blast I	Tatu
MISL renamed Major Soccer League
1990–91	San Diego Sockers (9)	Cleveland Crunch	Tatu
1991–92	San Diego Sockers (10)	Dallas Sidekicks	Zoran Karic

=== American Indoor Soccer Association/National Professional Soccer League (1984–2001) ===
Year	Winner (tot)	Runners-up	Leading goalscorer(s)
1984–85	Canton Invaders (1)	Louisville Thunder	Lesh Shkreli
1985–86	Canton Invaders (2)	Louisville Thunder	Kia Zolgharnain
1986–87	Louisville Thunder (1)	Canton Invaders	Rudy Pikuzinski
1987–88	Canton Invaders (3)	Fort Wayne Flames	Rudy Pikuzinski
1988–89	Canton Invaders (4)	Chicago Power	Karl-Heinz Granitza
1989–90	Canton Invaders (5)	Dayton Dynamo	Dan O'Keefe
AISA renamed National Professional Soccer League
1990–91	Chicago Power (1)	Dayton Dynamo	Andy Chapman
1991–92	Detroit Rockers (1)	Canton Invaders	Andy Chapman
1992–93	Kansas City Attack (1)	Cleveland Crunch	Hector Marinaro
1993–94	Cleveland Crunch (1)	St. Louis Ambush	Hector Marinaro
1994–95	St. Louis Ambush (1)	Harrisburg Heat	Hector Marinaro
1995–96	Cleveland Crunch (2)	Kansas City Attack	Hector Marinaro
1996–97	Kansas City Attack (2)	Cleveland Crunch	Hector Marinaro
1997–98	Milwaukee Wave (1)	St. Louis Ambush	Hector Marinaro
1998–99	Cleveland Crunch (3)	St. Louis Ambush	Doug Miller
1999–2000	Milwaukee Wave (2)	Cleveland Crunch	Hector Marinaro
2000–01	Milwaukee Wave (3)	Philadelphia KiXX	Denison Cabral

=== Continental Indoor Soccer League (1993–1997) ===
Year	Champion	Series	Runner-up	Leading goalscorer(s)
1993	Dallas Sidekicks (2)	2–1	San Diego Sockers	Tatu
1994	Las Vegas Dustdevils (1)	2–1	Dallas Sidekicks	Tatu
1995	Monterrey La Raza (1)	2–1	Sacramento Knights	Zizinho
1996	Monterrey La Raza (2)	2–0	Houston Hotshots	David Doyle
1997	Seattle SeaDogs (1)	2–0	Houston Hotshots	Paul Dougherty

=== World Indoor Soccer League (1998–2001) ===
- League known as the Premier Soccer Alliance for the 1998 season.

Year	Champion	Score / series	Runner-up	Leading goalscorer(s)
1998	Dallas Sidekicks (3)	6 to 2	Sacramento Knights	Tatu
1999	Sacramento Knights (1)	7 to 6	Dallas Sidekicks	David Doyle
2000	Monterrey La Raza (3)	6 to 5 (SO 3–1)	Dallas Sidekicks	Clint Regier
2001	Dallas Sidekicks (4)	2–1	San Diego Sockers	Ato Leone

=== Major Indoor Soccer League II (2001–2008) ===
Year	Winner (tot)	Runners-up	Leading goalscorer(s)
2001–2002	Philadelphia KiXX (1)	Milwaukee Wave	Dino Delevski
2002–2003	Baltimore Blast (1)	Milwaukee Wave	Dino Delevski
2003–2004	Baltimore Blast (2)	Milwaukee Wave	Greg Howes
2004–2005	Milwaukee Wave (4)	Cleveland Force	Greg Howes
2005–2006	Baltimore Blast (3)	St. Louis Steamers	Greg Howes
2006–2007	Philadelphia KiXX (2)	Detroit Ignition	Jamar Beasley
2007–2008	Baltimore Blast (4)	Monterrey La Raza	Greg Howes

=== Xtreme Soccer League (2008–2009) ===
Year	Winner (tot)	Runners-up	Leading goalscorer(s)
2008–09	Detroit Ignition^{17}	New Jersey Ironmen	Lucio Gonzaga

- ^Note 17 – League had no playoffs, regular season winner was champion.

=== National Indoor Soccer League/Major Indoor Soccer League III (2008–2014) ===
Year	Winner (tot)	Runners-up	Leading goalscorer(s)
2008–09	Baltimore Blast (5)	Rockford Rampage	Byron Alvarez
NISL renamed Major Indoor Soccer League
2009–10	Monterrey La Raza (4)	Milwaukee Wave	Genoni Martinez
2010–11	Milwaukee Wave (5)	Baltimore Blast	Byron Alvarez
2011–12	Milwaukee Wave (6)	Baltimore Blast	Geison Moura
2012–13	Baltimore Blast (6)	Missouri Comets	Doug Miller
2013–14	Missouri Comets (1)	Baltimore Blast	Ian Bennett

=== Professional Arena Soccer League/Major Arena Soccer League (2008–present) ===
Year	Winner (tot)	Runners-up	Leading goalscorer(s)
2008–09	Stockton Cougars (1)	1790 Cincinnati	Bernie Lilavois
2009–10	San Diego Sockers (1)	La Raza de Guadalajara	Jeff Hughes
2010–11	San Diego Sockers (2)	La Raza de Guadalajara	Kraig Chiles
2011–12	San Diego Sockers (3)	Detroit Waza	Kraig Chiles
2012–13	San Diego Sockers (4)	Detroit Waza	Kraig Chiles
2013–14	Chicago Mustangs (1)	Hidalgo La Fiera	Efrain Martinez, Bryan Moya
PASL renamed Major Arena Soccer League
2014–15	Monterrey Flash (1)	Baltimore Blast	Leo Gibson
2015–16	Baltimore Blast (7)	Sonora Suns	Franck Tayou
2016–17	Baltimore Blast (8)	Sonora Suns	Franck Tayou
2017–18	Baltimore Blast (9)	Monterrey Flash	Franck Tayou
2018–19	Milwaukee Wave (7)	Monterrey Flash	Franck Tayou
2019–20	playoffs canceled due to COVID-19 pandemic		Franck Tayou
2020–21	San Diego Sockers (5)	Ontario Fury	Ian Bennett
2021–22	San Diego Sockers (6)	Florida Tropics SC	Kraig Chiles
2022–23	Chihuahua Savage	Baltimore Blast	Franck Tayou
2023–24	Chihuahua Savage (2)	Kansas City Comets	Marco Fabian
2024–25	Chihuahua Savage (3)	Kansas City Comets	Jorge Rios

== See also ==
- List of MLS Cup finals
- List of U.S. Open Cup finals
- Soccer Bowl
- American soccer clubs in international competitions
