= List of United States men's national soccer team head coaches =

The role of the United States men's national soccer team coach was first established in 1916 with the appointment of Thomas Cahill. Forty-one men have occupied this position.

The following tables include various statistics for head coaches of the United States men's national soccer team (featuring matches, wins, losses, ties, goals for, goals against, and goal differential along with goals for average and goals-against average) from the team's inception in 1916 through the October 12, 2024, match against Panama.

The result percentage is based on the formula used by U.S. Soccer in their U.S. Soccer Media Guide, found on page 78.

== Head coaches ==
- Category items in **bold** represent leader based on a minimum of 18 matches

As of November 17, 2026.

All-Time Record: 364–168–286 (W–D–L) – 54.71% (counting draws as 0.5 wins and 0.5 losses)

Coaches	Years	M	Wins	Draws	Losses	Result %	GF	GA	GD	AGF	AGA	World Cup apps	Gold Cup titles	Nations League titles
(Argentina) Mauricio Pochettino	2024–2026	37	23	2	12	61.12%	77	48	+29	2.08	1.34	2026		
(United States) Mikey Varas	2024	2	0	1	1	25.00%	2	3	–1	1.00	1.50			
(United States) Gregg Berhalter	2018–2022, 2023–2024	74	44	13	17	**68.24%**	144	56	+88	**1.95**	0.76	2022	2021	2019–20, 2023–24
(United States) B. J. Callaghan	2023	7	4	3	0	78.57%	21	4	+17	3.00	0.57			2022–23
(United States) (England) Anthony Hudson	2023	5	2	2	1	60.00%	10	4	+6	2.00	1.00			
(United States) Dave Sarachan	2017–2018	12	3	4	5	41.67%	11	15	–4	0.92	1.25			event not held
(United States) Bruce Arena	1998–2006, 2017	**148**	**81**	**35**	32	66.55%	**243**	**111**	**+132**	1.64	**0.75**	2002, 2006	2002, 2005, 2017	event not held
(Germany) Jürgen Klinsmann	2011–2016	98	55	16	27	64.29%	178	109	+69	1.82	1.11	2014	2013	event not held
(United States) Bob Bradley	2007–2011	80	43	12	25	61.25%	134	97	+37	1.68	1.23	2010	2007	event not held
(United States) Steve Sampson	1995–1998	62	26	14	22	53.23%	83	69	+14	1.34	1.11	1998		event not held
(Socialist Federal Republic of Yugoslavia) (Federal Republic of Yugoslavia) Bora Milutinović	1991–1995	96	30	31	**35**	47.40%	116	110	+6	1.21	1.15	1994	1991	event not held
(United States) (Poland) John Kowalski	1991	2	1	1	0	75.00%	4	2	+2	2.00	1.00		event not held	event not held
(United States) Bob Gansler	1982, 1989–1991	37	15	6	16	48.65%	43	41	+2	1.16	1.11	1990	event not held	event not held
(West Germany) Lothar Osiander	1986–1988	18	4	5	9	36.11%	12	21	–9	0.67	1.17		event not held	event not held
(Greece) Alkis Panagoulias	1983–1985	18	6	7	5	52.78%	19	21	–2	1.06	1.17		event not held	event not held
(Ukraine) (United States) Walt Chyzowych	1976–1980	32	8	10	14	40.63%	26	50	–24	0.81	1.56		event not held	event not held
(West Germany) (United States) Manfred Schellscheidt	1975	3	0	0	3	0.00%	1	11	–10	0.33	3.67		event not held	event not held
(United States) Al Miller	1975	2	0	0	2	0.00%	0	11	–11	0.00	5.50		event not held	event not held
(West Germany) Dettmar Cramer	1974	2	0	0	2	0.00%	1	4	–3	0.50	2.00		event not held	event not held
(United States) Gordon Bradley	1973	5	0	0	5	0.00%	1	9	–8	0.20	1.80		event not held	event not held
(United States) Gene Chyzowych	1973	5	3	0	2	60.00%	4	5	–1	0.80	1.80		event not held	event not held
(Poland) Max Wosniak	1973	2	0	0	2	0.00%	0	8	–8	0.00	4.00		event not held	event not held
(United States) Bob Kehoe	1971–1972	4	0	1	3	12.50%	6	10	–4	1.50	2.50		event not held	event not held
(England) Gordon Jago	1969	2	0	0	2	0.00%	0	3	–3	0.00	1.50		event not held	event not held
(Wales) Phil Woosnam	1968	9	4	1	4	50.00%	22	22	0	2.44	2.44		event not held	event not held
(United States) George Meyer	1957, 1965	8	1	2	5	25.00%	9	26	–17	1.13	3.25		event not held	event not held
(West Germany) John Herberger	1964	1	0	0	1	0.00%	0	10	–10	0.00	10.00		event not held	event not held
(United States) Jim Reed	1959–1961	4	0	1	3	12.50%	4	16	–12	1.00	4.00		event not held	event not held
(Scotland) Jimmy Mills	1956	1	0	0	1	0.00%	1	9	–8	1.00	9.00		event not held	event not held
(Hungary) Ernő Schwarz	1953–1955	6	2	0	4	33.33%	12	18	–6	2.00	3.00		event not held	event not held
(England) John Wood	1952	2	0	0	2	0.00%	0	14	–14	0.00	7.00		event not held	event not held
(Scotland) Bill Jeffrey	1950	3	1	0	2	33.33%	4	8	–4	1.33	2.67	1950	event not held	event not held
(United States) Walter Giesler	1948–1949	8	1	1	6	33.33%	8	44	–36	1.00	5.50		event not held	event not held
(Scotland) Andrew Brown	1947	2	0	0	2	0.00%	2	10	–8	1.00	5.00		event not held	event not held
(United States) Bill Lloyd	1937	3	0	0	3	0.00%	6	19	–13	2.00	6.33		event not held	event not held
(United States) Elmer Schroeder	1936	1	0	0	1	0.00%	0	1	–1	0.00	1.00		event not held	event not held
(Scotland) David Gould	1934	2	1	0	1	50.00%	5	9	–4	2.50	4.50	1934	event not held	event not held
(Scotland) Robert Millar	1930	4	2	0	2	50.00%	10	10	0	2.50	2.50	1930	event not held	event not held
(England) George Burford	1924, 1928	6	2	1	3	41.67%	10	22	–12	1.67	3.67	event not held	event not held	event not held
(England) Nat Agar	1925–1926	3	2	0	1	66.67%	12	3	+8	4.00	1.33	event not held	event not held	event not held
(United States) Thomas Cahill	1916	2	1	1	0	75.00%	4	3	+1	2.00	1.50	event not held	event not held	event not held

USMNT All-Time Scores – SoccerOverThere.com.
USA national football team
United States men's national soccer team results
