= 1958–59 American Soccer League =

American Soccer League 1958–59 season
- Season: 1958–59
- Teams: 9
- Champions: New York Hakoah (3rd title)
- Top goalscorer: Pasquale Pepe (17)

Statistics of American Soccer League II in season 1958–59.

== League standings ==
Pos	Team	Pld	W	D	L	GF	GA	Pts
1	New York Hakoah	16	11	3	2	52	31	25
2	Ukrainian Nationals	16	8	3	5	32	22	19
3	Uhrik Truckers	15	8	1	6	47	44	17
4	Brooklyn Italians	16	6	3	7	39	31	15
5	Baltimore Pompei	16	5	5	6	40	39	15
6	Fall River SC	15	6	3	6	28	29	15
7	Galicia SC	16	3	7	6	40	49	13
8	Newark Portuguese	15	3	6	6	34	42	12
9	Elizabeth Falcons	15	3	3	9	31	54	9

Source: rsssf.com
