= Jimmy Mills =

Scottish-American footballer and coach

Personal information
- Date of birth: 1 July 1894
- Place of birth: Dundee, Scotland
- Date of death: 8 October 1990 (aged 96)
- Place of death: Sebring, Florida, United States
- Position: Wing-half

Youth career
- St. Clemens

Senior career*
| Years | Team | Apps | (Gls) |
- Shettleston
- Vale of Leven
- Kirkintilloch Rob Roy
- Bathgate
- Clyde
| 1920–1923 | Toronto Caledonians | | |
| 1924–1925 | Philadelphia Field Club | 26 | (1) |
| 1925–1935 | Fairhill | | |

Managerial career
- 1925–1953: Fairhill F.C.
- 1938: Penn Quakers
- 1942–1953: Philadelphia Nationals
- 1953–1956: Brookhattan
- 1956–: Uhrik Truckers
- 1949–1970: Haverford Fords
- 1956: US Olympic Team
- 1974–1980: Girard College (assistant)
- 1981–1983: Girard College
- * Club domestic league appearances and goals

Jimmy Mills (1 July 1894 – 8 October 1990) was a Scottish-American soccer wing-half and coach. He gained his greatest fame as a coach, taking his teams to five league, three league cup titles and two McGuire Cup titles In 1956, he coached the US Olympic soccer team at the 1956 Summer Olympics. He is a member of the National Soccer Hall of Fame.

== Player ==
Born in Dundee, Mills moved first to Paisley then to Bridgeton, Glasgow as a young boy. He began his career with St. Clemens in the Churches League. In 1909, he began playing in the Scottish Junior Football Association with Shettleston F.C., Vale of Clyde F.C. and Kirkintilloch Rob Roy. He then moved to Bathgate F.C. when he was seventeen. He also spent time with Clyde F.C. before transferring to Canada in 1920 where he joined the Toronto Caledonians of the National League. In 1923, he moved to the United States, but does not show up on a professional roster until the 1924–1925 season when he played twenty-two games for the Philadelphia Field Club of the American Soccer League. He saw time in only four games at the start of the 1925-1926 season before moving to Fairhill F.C. of the Allied League of Philadelphia. Mills would continue to play for Fairhill until 1935.

== Coach ==
When Mills joined Fairhill F.C. in 1925, he became the team's coach as well as a player. Over the next sixty years, Mills forged a legendary coaching reputation as he led multiple teams at the collegiate, amateur, professional and national levels. While Mills continued to coach and play for Fairhill until 1953, he also became a college coach when he replaced David Gould as the head coach at the University of Pennsylvania in 1938. He spent only one season at Penn before becoming the head coach of the boys' team at The Episcopal Academy. He coached the boys for the next twelve years. In 1942, Fairhill F.C. purchased the professional Philadelphia Nationals of the American Soccer League and elevated Mills to head coach. A traditionally poorly performing team, the Nationals suffered under several poor seasons before Mills slowly built them into the league's dominant team. Beginning in 1948, Mills' led the Nationals to a string of league (1949, 1950, 1951 and 1953 ) and Lewis Cup (1949, 1951 and 1952) titles. In 1953, Brookhattan hired Mills. He spent two seasons with the team before returning to Philadelphia in 1956 when Uhrik Truckers hired Mills. He promptly took them to the league championship. By that time, Mills had established himself at the collegiate level. His year at Penn and his work at the Episcopal Academy brought him to the attention of Haverford College which hired him in 1949. He remained in that position until 1970, coaching every season except 1956 when he headed the US Olympic soccer team. Mills compiled a 126–94–21 record in his twenty seasons with Haverford which continues to host an annual Jimmy Mills Soccer Tournament. During many of his years with Haverford, Mills held practice only after working all day repairing looms at a Philadelphia carpet mill. In 1974, he became an assistant coach at Girard College before moving up to the head coach position in 1981. In 1983, a heart attack ended his coaching career at the age of 88. Mills also spent twenty years as the coach of the Lighthouse Boys Club, taking the team to twenty consecutive city championships as well as the 1957 and 1967 US U-19 championships (McGuire Cup).

=== Olympic team ===
In 1956, Mills coached the US Olympic soccer team at the 1956 Summer Olympics. While the team lost to Yugoslavia, 9–1, in the first round, it had a successful pre-tournament tour of Asia. Playing a mix of national and club teams, the US went 5–3 on the tour.

== Honors ==
Mills was inducted into the National Soccer Hall of Fame in 1954 and the NSCAA Hall of Fame in 1991. In 1981, he was also honoured with the Eastern Pennsylvania Youth Soccer Association's Service to Youth Award. Mills was an inaugural inductee in to the United Soccer Coaches Hall of Fame in 1991.

=== Coach ===
Philadelphia Nationals

- American Soccer League
  - champions: 1948–49, 1949–50, 1950–51, 1952–53
- Lewis Cup
  - winners: 1949, 1951, 1952
  - runners-up: 1950, 1953
- National Challenge Cup
  - runners-up: 1949, 1952

Brookhattan

- American Soccer League
  - runners-up: 1953–54

Uhrik Truckers

- American Soccer League
  - champions: 1954–55, 1955–56
- Lewis Cup
  - winners: 1955

Haverford Fords

- Middle Atlantic Conferences
  - winners: 1950, 1953, 1954
