= 1956–57 American Soccer League =

American Soccer League 1956–57 season
- Season: 1956–57
- Teams: 8
- Champions: New York Hakoah
- Top goalscorer: George Brown (13)

Statistics of American Soccer League II in season 1956–57.

== League standings ==
Pos	Team	Pld	W	D	L	GF	GA	Pts
1	New York Hakoah	12	10	1	1	44	10	21
2	Uhrik Truckers	14	7	1	6	37	27	15
3	Newark Portuguese	14	6	3	5	28	28	15
4	Elizabeth Falcons	13	6	2	5	37	26	14
5	Ludlow S.C.	13	6	2	5	26	40	14
6	Brookhattan	13	6	0	7	27	29	12
7	Brooklyn Italians	14	4	2	8	22	32	10
8	Baltimore Rockets	13	2	1	10	19	48	5

Source: rsssf.com

== League awards ==
- MVP: John Oliver
