= 1959–60 American Soccer League =

American Soccer League 1959–60 season
- Season: 1959–60
- Teams: 10
- Champions: Colombo
- Top goalscorer: Mike Noha (16)

Statistics of American Soccer League II in season 1959–60.

== League standings ==
Pos	Team	Pld	W	D	L	GF	GA	Pts
1	Colombo	18	15	1	2	70	25	31
2	Ukrainian Nationals	16	12	2	2	49	21	26
3	New York Hakoah	16	7	4	5	31	22	18
4	Brooklyn Italians	15	7	1	7	30	25	15
5	Baltimore Pompei	13	6	1	6	34	27	13
6	Fall River SC	13	5	3	5	26	27	13
7	Galicia SC	16	4	5	7	32	40	13
8	Newark Portuguese	16	5	2	9	24	39	12
9	Falcons SC	16	3	3	10	25	52	9
10	Uhrik Truckers	17	2	2	13	26	69	6

Source: rsssf.com
