= 1960–61 American Soccer League =

American Soccer League 1960–61 season
- Season: 1960–61
- Teams: 10
- Champions: Ukrainian Nationals
- Top goalscorer: Herman Niss (17)
- Longest unbeaten run: Ukrainian Nationals (14)

Statistics of American Soccer League II in season 1960–61.

== League standings ==
Pos	Team	Pld	W	D	L	GF	GA	Pts
1	Ukrainian Nationals	14	12	2	0	60	10	26
2	Falcons SC	15	8	2	5	35	21	18
3	New York Hakoah	14	8	1	5	27	25	17
4	Fall River SC	16	8	1	7	27	35	17
5	Galicia SC	14	6	4	4	27	23	16
6	Inter SC	15	6	3	6	30	28	15
7	Newark Portuguese	16	5	2	9	30	43	14 (Note: +2 points?)
8	Brooklyn Italians	14	4	3	7	17	23	11
9	Baltimore Pompei	6	4	1	1	26	38	9
10	Uhrik Truckers	14	1	1	12	18	42	3

Source: rsssf.com
