= 1955–56 American Soccer League =

American Soccer League 1955–56 season
- Season: 1955–56
- Teams: 9
- Champions: Uhrik Truckers (8th title)
- Premiers: Uhrik Truckers & Elizabeth Falcons
- Top goalscorer: Gene Grabowski (19)

Statistics of American Soccer League II in season 1955–56.

== League standings ==
Pos	Team	Pld	W	D	L	GF	GA	Pts
1	Uhrik Truckers	16	10	4	2	48	25	24
1	Elizabeth Falcons	16	10	4	2	45	26	24
3	Ludlow Lusitano	16	10	2	4	35	17	22
4	Newark Portuguese	16	7	5	4	40	24	19
5	Brookhattan	16	6	1	9	31	29	13
6	New York Americans	15	4	5	6	34	30	13
7	Brooklyn Hakoah	15	4	5	6	23	34	13
8	Brooklyn Hispano	14	2	4	8	20	34	8
9	Baltimore Rockets	16	1	2	13	21	77	4

== Championship playoff ==
For the second time in ASL history there was a tie at the top of the table. Since two teams finished the season with exactly the same record and point totals, a single match championship playoff was held. In the event that this match had ended in a draw the following procedures were to be used. Two 15-minute overtime periods to be played in their entirety. If the match was still tied after 120 minutes, the teams would then play successive seven and a half minute periods until one team either scored a golden goal or earned a corner kick.

July 1, 1956
3:00 PM

Uhrik Truckers	5–1	Elizabeth Falcons
Benny McLaughlin, Dick Packer, Jack Ferris	Report 1 Report 2	Gene Grabowski

Zerega Oval, Bronx, New York
Attendance: 1,500
Referee: James MacLean
