= Cabot Education Centre =

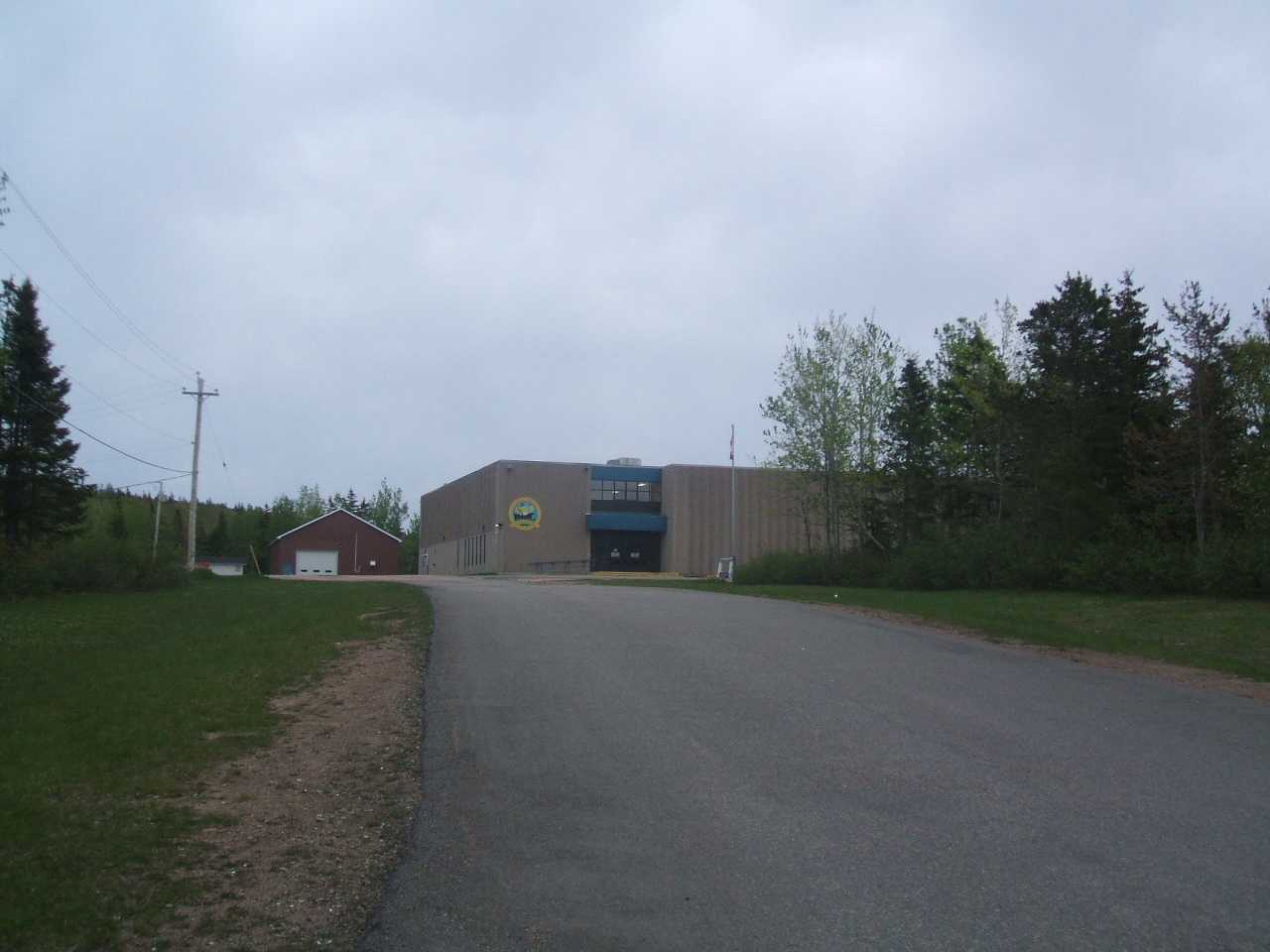
- As viewed from the Cabot Trail in 2010

Location
- 32039 Cabot Trail; Neil's Harbour, Nova Scotia, B0C 1N0; Canada
- Coordinates: 46.82458°N 60.36103°W

Information
- School type: Secondary
- School board: Cape Breton - Victoria Regional School Board
- Principal: Heather MacIsaac
- Grades: 6-12
- Enrollment: 250 (approximate)
- Language: English
- Colours: Navy , Red , and White
- Mascot: Caravel
- Website: cbvrce.ca/home/?q=content%2Fcabot-education-centre

Cabot Education Centre is a secondary school located in Neil's Harbour, Nova Scotia, Canada, on northern Cape Breton Island in Victoria County. It is governed by the Cape Breton – Victoria Regional School Board.

== Overview ==
The 2008-09 enrollment of the school was 235 students, with 113 at the junior level and 122 at the senior high level. It is reportedly the only school in Nova Scotia where 100% of students are bused to school.

A major addition was completed in 1988–89, adding several new classrooms and a new cafeteria.

== Sports ==
In 1993, National Soccer Hall of Fame member George Brown coached the girls soccer team to the Provincial Championship.

In 2016, the Cabot Trailblazers won the NSSAF Provincial Championship for the first time in school history, defeating the Pugwash Panthers—then four-time defending champions—by a score of 95–89.
