= Neils Harbour, Nova Scotia =

Community in Nova Scotia, Canada

Neils Harbour Gaelic: Acarsaid Nèill
- Unincorporated area
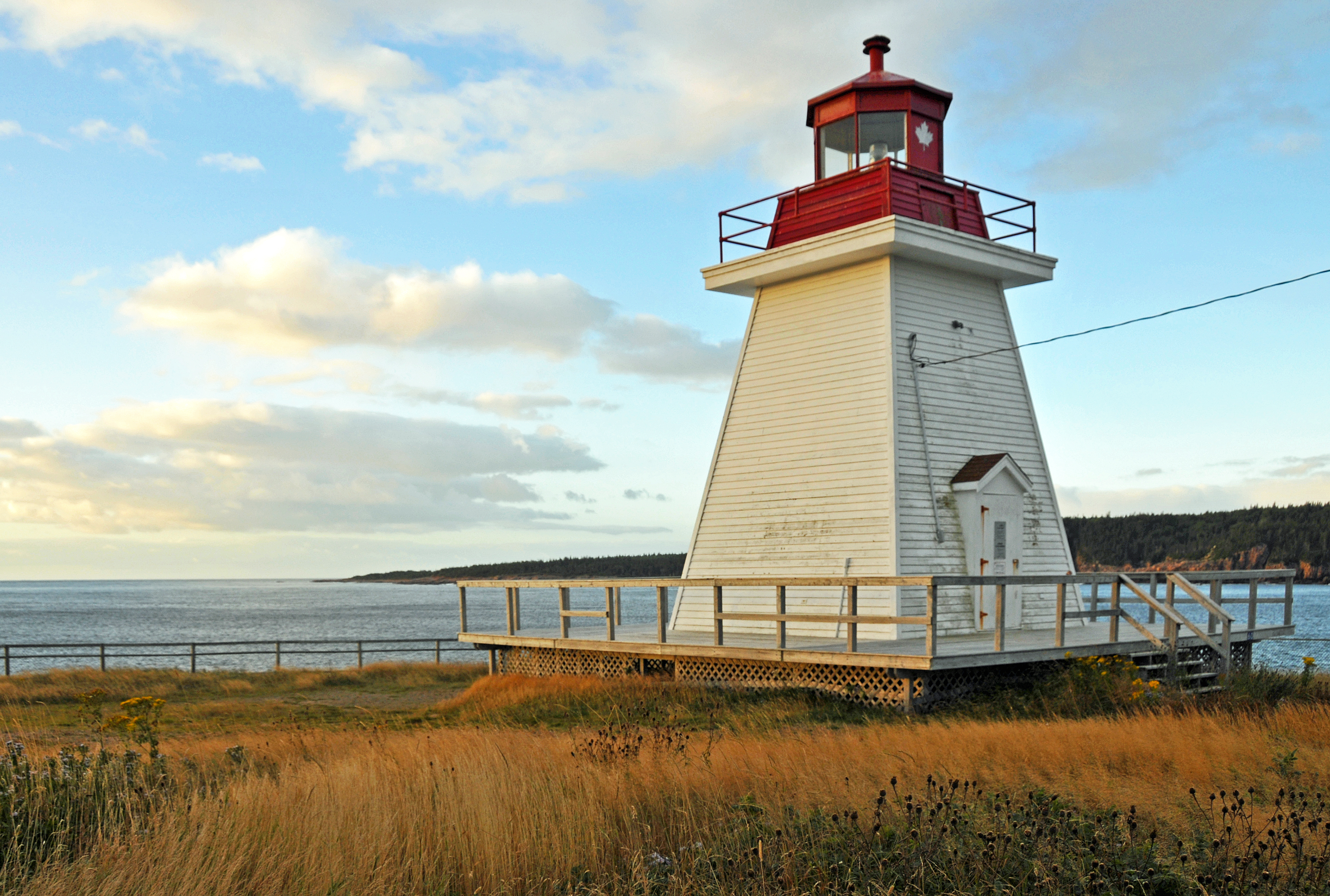
- The Neils Harbour Lighthouse

- Location of Neils Harbour, Nova Scotia
- Coordinates: 46°48′21″N 60°19′12″W
- Country: Canada
- Province: Nova Scotia
- Municipality: Municipality of the County of Victoria
- Time zone: UTC−4 (AST)
  - Summer (DST): UTC−3 (ADT)
- Canadian Postal Code: B0C 1N0
- Area code: 902
- Telephone Exchange: 336
- NTS Map: 011K16
- GNBC Code: CBBFE

Neils Harbour is an unincorporated area in the Municipality of the County of Victoria, Cape Breton Island, Nova Scotia, Canada.

The area is named after one Neil McLennan. It is believed that this is the place referred to by Pichon as "Quarachoque' between Niganiche (Ingonish) and Aspre (Aspy Bay). He refers to it as a creek.

The town has an operating Anglican church and a non-operational Presbyterian church.

The population is approximately 300 permanent residents. There are a few cottages, but mostly there are residents who work in the lobster/crab and fishing industry. Neils Harbour is followed by a neighbouring tiny community known as New Haven. New Haven is home to one of the most successful seafood export and markets, however its success belongs to the fishermen of the community who have been successors of their ancestors, passing down crab, lobster, halibut, and other licenses. The most significant boat which has been operational at this exact point in New Haven since the 1970’s is the Blue Mist IV. This boat has been passed through a father (Henry T. Rose) and son Kenneth Rose, who is currently operating it seasonally selling crab and lobster. This boat is set to be inherited by Kenneth’s daughter, Morgan. You may see this boat parked at the Victoria Coop-Fisheries processing plant wharf.

The first school was constructed in 1878. The Cabot Education Centre lies on the west side of the village on the Cabot Trail.
