= United Soccer Coaches =

Soccer organization

- Formation: 1941
- Type: Non-governmental organization
- Legal status: Nonprofit organization
- Purpose: Professional association
- Headquarters: Kansas City, Missouri
- Region served: United States
- Members: 15,000+
- Managing Director: Allison Pronske
- Affiliations: NCAA; NAIA; NCCAA; NJCAA; State high school associations
- Website: http://www.unitedsoccercoaches.org

Former logo (as NSCAA)

The United Soccer Coaches (formerly known as the National Soccer Coaches Association of America (NSCAA)) is an organization of American soccer coaches founded in 1941. It is the largest soccer coaches organization in the world, with more than 15,000 members. It offers training courses for both beginning and experienced coaches and a wide range of award programs. Rare among sports organizations, it serves its sport for both men/boys and women/girls. Allison Pronske is the current Managing Director. The NSCAA was rebranded as United Soccer Coaches on August 2, 2017.

== Annual convention ==
The annual United Soccer Coaches Convention, known as "The World's Largest Annual Gathering of Soccer Coaches" is held in mid-January. The five-day event attracts more than 12,000 attendees for live field demonstration and lecture sessions, networking socials, coaching diploma training classes, and a large soccer-only trade show, with more than 300 companies displaying soccer equipment, technology and services.

As the group announced its new name in Chicago on August 2, 2017, it also listed the sites for the annual convention through 2032:

Philadelphia– 2018, 2023, 2026, 2030

Chicago– 2019, 2025, 2031

Baltimore– 2020, 2028, 2032

Anaheim– 2021, 2024, 2029

Kansas City– 2022, 2027

On August 26, 2020, the association announced that the 2021 United Soccer Coaches Convention would take place online, in a digital format. The 2021 Convention was originally scheduled to be held in Anaheim, California, but the organization decided to cancel the in-person event due to the COVID-19 pandemic.

== Awards programs ==
United Soccer Coaches operates a wide variety of awards programs. These include:

- College awards
  - All-America teams
    - NCAA Division I men and women and Divisions II/III men and women
    - NAIA men and women
    - NCCAA Divisions I and II men and women
    - Junior College Division I and III men and women
  - Scholar All-America teams
    - NCAA Division I men and women and Divisions II/III men and women
    - NAIA men and women
    - NCCAA Divisions I and II men and women
    - Junior College Division I and III men and women
  - All-Region Awards
    - NCAA Division I men and women and Divisions II/III men and women
    - NAIA men and women
    - Junior College Division I and III men and women
  - National Player of the Year
    - Division I men and women – Between 1996 and 1998, the NSCAA recognized an outstanding collegiate player of the year.
      Since 1999, the NSCAA has coordinated its NCAA Division I Player of the Year program with the Missouri Athletic Club.
      They now present the joint NSCAA/MAC Hermann Trophy to the outstanding men's and women's player of the year.
    - NCAA Divisions II/III men and women
    - NAIA men and women
    - NCCAA Divisions I and II men and women
    - Junior College Division I and III men and women
  - College Player Award of Distinction
  - National Coach of the Year award
    - NCAA Division I men and women and Divisions II/III men and women
    - NAIA men and women
    - NCCAA Divisions I and II men and women
    - Junior College Division I and III men and women
  - Regional Coach of the Year award
    - NCAA Division I men and women and Divisions II/III men and women
    - NAIA men and women
    - NCCAA Divisions I and II men and women
    - Junior College Division I and III men and women
  - 1 National Assistant Coach of the Year award
  - 4 Regional Assistant Coach of the Year awards
  - Team Academic Award
    - Awarded to all teams meeting the criteria
  - Team Ethics and Sportsmanship
    - Gold, Silver, or Bronze awards to all teams meeting the criteria
  - Team Pinnacle Award
    - Awarded to teams who have earned the "...Team Academic Award, earned a Team Ethics and Sportsmanship Award, and achieved a team winning percentage of .750 or higher during the season of the academic year for the award."
  - Bill Jeffery Award
    - Awarded annually to one individual for "...long-term service to collegiate soccer."
- High school awards
  - All-America teams
  - Scholar All-America teams
  - All-Region Awards
  - National Player of the Week
  - State Player of the Week
  - High School Coach of the Year
    - 1 National & 4 Regional awards
  - High School Assistant Coach of the Year
    - 1 National & 4 Regional awards
  - Robert W. "Robby" Robinson Award supported by the American Youth Soccer Organization
    - Awarded annually to one individual for "...long-term service to scholastic soccer."
  - Senior Excellence Award
    - Awarded to high school seniors nominated by their coaches to honor "...exceptional contributions to the team while exemplifying the finest attributes of a high school student-athlete."
  - High School Team Academic Award
    - Awarded to all teams meeting the criteria
  - High School Team Ethics and Sportsmanship
    - Gold, Silver, or Bronze awards to all teams meeting the criteria
- Youth awards
  - National Youth Coach of the Year
  - Regional Youth Coaches of the Year
  - Youth Coach Award of Excellence
  - Charlotte Moran Award
    - Awarded annually to one individual who has "...raised youth soccer to new heights through his or her long-term dedication to the game."
  - Youth Player Award of Excellence
  - Youth Participation Certificate
    - Awarded by coaches to their team members

== Rankings ==
United Soccer Coaches also publishes weekly rankings for intercollegiate and high school soccer during the fall seasons and less frequently during the winter and spring high school seasons.

== See also ==
- 2013 NSCAA Men's Soccer All-Americans
- Soccer in the United States
- United Soccer Coaches Hall of Fame
