= 1954–55 American Soccer League =

American Soccer League 1954–55 season
- Season: 1954–55
- Teams: 9
- Champions: Uhrik Truckers (7th title)
- Top goalscorer: John Ferris (20)

Statistics of American Soccer League II in season 1954–55.

== League standings ==
Pos	Team	Pld	W	D	L	GF	GA	Pts
1	Uhrik Truckers	16	12	2	2	56	26	26
2	Brooklyn Hispano	16	12	1	3	48	25	25
3	New York Hakoah	15	8	5	2	39	20	21
4	New York Brookhattan	15	7	2	6	47	44	16
5	Elizabeth Falcons	16	5	3	8	25	29	13
6	Newark Portuguese	16	4	4	8	35	38	12
7	Trenton Americans	15	4	4	7	23	47	12
8	New York Americans	16	2	4	10	32	46	8
9	Baltimore Rockets	14	2	3	9	28	40	7

Source: rsssf.com
