= Seattle Mitre Eagles =

American soccer club in Port Orchard, Washington

The Seattle Mitre Eagles were an American soccer club based in Port Orchard, Washington. The club is notable for finishing as runners-up of the 1987 U.S. Open Cup, and participating in the 1988 CONCACAF Champions' Cup where they lost to Mexico's Cruz Azul 9–0 on aggregate. The Eagles held Cruz Azul to a 0–0 draw in the second leg of the series at Memorial Stadium in Seattle.

== History ==
The origin of the club is unknown, but it is likely that the team formed in the mid-1980s. The founders of the team were former University of Washington students, and ex-players who played for FC Seattle Storm. The team played most of their matches at high school stadiums in the Seattle area, including in Shoreline, Washington.

== Honors ==
- U.S. Open Cup Runners-up (1): 1987
- Participations in CONCACAF Champions' Cup: 1988
