= David Gould =

Scottish American soccer player, coach, and referee

Personal information
- Date of birth: January 9, 1873
- Place of birth: Galston, Scotland
- Date of death: January 25, 1939 (aged 66)
- Place of death: United States

Managerial career
- Years: Team
- 1934: United States

David L. Gould (January 9, 1873 – January 25, 1939) was a Scottish American soccer player, coach and referee. He coached the U.S. national team at the 1934 FIFA World Cup and is a member of the National Soccer Hall of Fame. He was born in Galston, Scotland.

== Player ==
Gould grew up playing soccer in Scotland before moving to the United States in 1891. He was eighteen at the time. When he arrived, he began playing with Philadelphia Athletic of the Pennsylvania League. While Gould's Hall of Fame profile notes he played for Philadelphia Phillies in the American League of Association Football, it has been asserted that no records exist to substantiate this claim. This confusion probably arises from how Gould's name was spelled in contemporary newspaper accounts. For example, in a game in which Gould played for the John A. Manz team in December, 1895, accounts in The Philadelphia Inquirer spell his name as "Gold" while accounts in The New York Times spell his name as "Gould" A Gold did play for the Phillies against Boston on October 20, 1894, at left wing and scored a goal in that game Unfortunately, no first initial is provided in the press account in order to be certain as to whether this Gold is David Gould. Gould did play for numerous teams including John A. Manz F.C., winner of the 1897 American Challenge Cup, Thistles, British-Americans and Eagles.

== Coach ==
In 1911, Gould became the assistant coach at the University of Pennsylvania. He coached the freshman team until ill health led to his replacement by fellow Hall of Fame member Jimmy Mills in 1938. Each year the University of Pennsylvania recognizes its top men's soccer player with the David L. Gould trophy.

In 1934, Gould was selected to coach the U.S. national team at the 1934 FIFA World Cup. As the U.S. was late in applying for the cup, it needed to play Mexico in a qualification game in Rome. The U.S. won that game, but fell in the first round to eventual champion Italy.

== Referee ==
In addition to his playing and coaching career, Gould also served as a referee for several decades. A December 13, 1917 Boston Globe article states, "Speaking of referees one of the veteran Philadelphia magnate says that he was of the opinion that the referees of today do not compare to those seven or eight years ago, when such well known officials as Philip Bishop, Edward Waldern, James Danby and David Gould held the indicators." On October 30, 1926, he was a linesman for the U.S.-Canada international game. Gould served as the president of both the Referees' Examining Board and the Referees' Association.
