= 1942 National Challenge Cup =

Football cup championship in the United States

- Dewar Challenge Cup

Tournament details
- Country: United States
- Dates: 25 December 1941 – 31 May 1942

Final positions
- Champions: Gallatin S.C.
- Runners-up: Pawtucket Rangers
- Semifinalists: Sparta; Philadelphia Americans

The 1942 National Challenge Cup was the 29th edition of the United States Football Association's annual open cup. Today, the tournament is known as the Lamar Hunt U.S. Open Cup. Teams from the American Soccer League II competed in the tournament, based on qualification methods in their base region.

Pittsburgh Gallatin SC won the tournament for first time defeating the defending champions, Pawtucket F.C. of Pawtucket, Rhode Island in the two-game final, 2-1 and 4-2.
