= Benny McLaughlin =

American soccer player

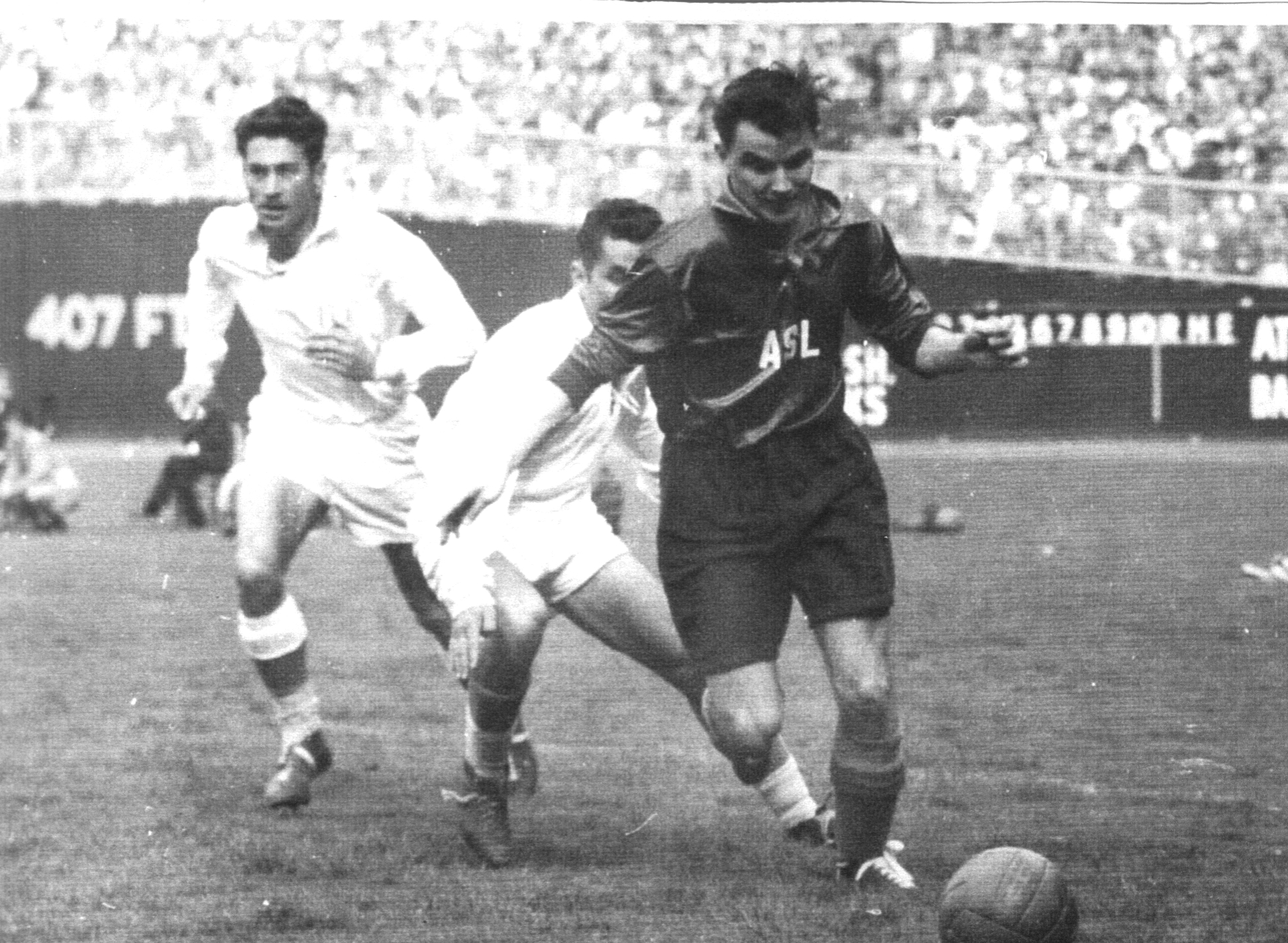
- American Soccer League All Star team vs. Hapoel Tel Aviv in 1947

Personal information
- Full name: Bernard Joseph McLaughlin, Jr.
- Date of birth: April 10, 1928
- Place of birth: Philadelphia, Pennsylvania, United States
- Date of death: December 27, 2012 (aged 84)
- Place of death: West Chester, Pennsylvania, United States
- Height: 5 ft 8 in (1.73 m)
- Position: Forward

Youth career
- Lighthouse Boys Club
- Temple University

Senior career*
Years	Team	Apps	(Gls)
1945–1954	Philadelphia Nationals		
1955–1957	New York Brookhattan		
1958–1960	Uhrik Truckers		
1961	New York Hakoah		
1961–1963	New York German-Hungarians		
1963–1965	Vereinigung Erzgebirge		

International career
1948–1957	United States	13	(0)
- * Club domestic league appearances and goals

Bernard "Benny" McLaughlin Jr. (April 10, 1928 – December 27, 2012) was an American soccer forward who starred in the American Soccer League in the 1940s and 1950s. He earned twelve caps with the U.S. national team, was a member of the 1948 U.S. Olympic soccer team and was inducted into the National Soccer Hall of Fame in 1997.

== Youth and college ==
McLaughlin, one of the best U.S. soccer players of his era, was born in the Kensington neighborhood in Philadelphia, Pennsylvania. He attended Northeast Catholic High School, graduating in 1946. He then attended Temple University, where he was a 1946 first team All American soccer player. In 1979, Temple University inducted McLaughlin into its Hall of Fame.

== Olympic and national team ==
In 1948, McLaughlin was a member of the U.S. Olympic soccer team which competed at the 1948 Summer Olympics. However, the experience was not a pleasant one, as the U.S. lost 9–0 to Italy. McLaughlin then went on to play for the U.S. national team. His first game with the senior team came in another bruising loss, this time an 11–0 defeat at the hands of Norway on August 6, 1948. In those years, the national team played only a handful of games a year, but McLaughlin saw time in nearly all of them. In 1949, he was integral to the U.S. as it qualified for the 1950 FIFA World Cup. He was selected to the finals squad, but did not travel with the team to the tournament because he was unable to get time off from work and was planning his wedding. Despite that, McLaughlin continued to play with the national team until 1957. According to FIFA.com, his last game in a FIFA competition came against Mexico in a 7–2 defeat in April 1957.

== Professional career ==
Even while in college, McLaughlin spent time with several top amateur and professional teams in Philadelphia. He began with the Lighthouse Boys Club, a local youth athletic club founded in 1902 by various local benevolence societies. The Lighthouse were one of the top youth clubs of the era, taking the 1938 McGuire Cup. However, records do not show when he played with the team that year. In 1945, he moved to the Philadelphia Nationals of the American Soccer League (ASL), remaining with the team through the 1954 season. In 1949, he scored ten goals and in 1952 was voted the ASL MVP. The Nationals won the ASL title four times while McLaughlin played for them, 1949, 1950, 1951 and 1953. In 1955, he joined New York Brookhattan. In 1958 he moved to Uhrik Truckers. In 1961, he spent a single season with New York Hakoah. He then moved to the German American Soccer League, playing for the New York German-Hungarians from 1961 to 1963. He then finished his career with the amateur Philadelphia club Vereinigung Erzgebirge in the United Soccer League of Pennsylvania, playing for Erzegebirge from 1963 to 1965. Years later, Len Oliver, a veteran of the American Soccer League, wrote, "The smaller McLaughlin inspired us with his finesse, dribbling opponents one-on-one throughout the game, lithe, snaking through defenses, setting up other attackers with deadly through pass, a little guy taking on the biggest defenders. Bouncing up from bruising tackle, and also possessing a devastating shot."

== Post-playing career ==
McLaughlin spent his post-playing life in Philadelphia, where he worked for the city of Philadelphia and in the private sector. He had six children and 12 grandchildren.

In 1977, McLaughlin was inducted into the National Soccer Hall of Fame. In March 2008, he was inducted into the Northeast Catholic High School Soccer Hall of Fame. He is also a member of the Southeast Pennsylvania Soccer Hall of Fame and the Temple University Sports Hall of Fame.

He died on December 27, 2012, at age 84, in West Chester, Pennsylvania.
