= Juri Kulischenko =

Ukrainian-American soccer player

Yuri Kulischenko
Personal information
- Date of birth: November 27, 1930
- Place of birth: Pavlohrad, Ukrainian SSR, Soviet Ukraine (now Ukraine)
- Date of death: October 27, 1994 (aged 63)
- Place of death: Frankfurt, Germany
- Position: Goalkeeper

Senior career*
Years	Team	Apps	(Gls)
1957–1960	Philadelphia Ukrainians	?	(?)
Total		?	(?)

International career
1959	U.S. Olympic	1	(0)
- * Club domestic league appearances and goals

Juri Kulischenko (Note: Ukrainian: Юрій Куліщенко, romanized: Yurii Kulishchenko) (November 27, 1930 – October 27, 1994, sometimes spelled Yuri Kulishenko) was a Ukrainian American international soccer player who earned one cap for the U.S. National and Olympic Teams in 1959. He was a member of the bronze medal-winning team at the 1959 Pan American Games in Chicago.

Kulishenko played club soccer for the Philadelphia Ukrainians. He was voted MVP of the American Soccer League in 1959.

Kulishenko was born in Pavlohrad, Soviet Ukraine. Following the Second World War, he was in a displaced persons camp in Germany with his mother, Maria (later Popenko), and elder brother, Wladimir (1925–1990). They immigrated to the United States in 1952 and he became an American citizen in 1953. He worked as a civil engineer.
