= Jack Hynes (soccer) =

American soccer player and coach

Personal information
- Full name: John Hynes
- Date of birth: November 12, 1920
- Place of birth: Lochgelly, Scotland
- Date of death: 3 August 2013 (aged 92)
- Place of death: Staten Island, New York, United States
- Position: Outside right

Senior career*
Years	Team	Apps	(Gls)
–1938	Brooklyn St. Mary's Celtic		
1938–1941	Swedish F.C.		
1941–1952	New York Americans		
1952–1954	Brookhattan		
1954–1957	Brooklyn Hakoah		
1957–1959	Brookhattan		
1959–1960	Colombo		

International career^{‡}
1949	United States	4	(0)

Managerial career
- 1959–1960: Colombo
- Wagner College
- Swedish F.C.
- * Club domestic league appearances and goals as of 17:47, 24 February 2007 (UTC) ‡ National team caps and goals as of 7 December 2006

John Hynes (1920 – 3 August 2013) was an American soccer forward. He spent over twenty years in the American Soccer League, twice earning league MVP recognition. In 1949, he earned four caps with the United States men's national soccer team. In addition to playing professional soccer, Hynes was a New York City fireman from 1947 to 1975 and served in the U.S. Army in World War II. He is a member of the National Soccer Hall of Fame.

== Playing career ==
Hynes emigrated to the United States from Scotland when he was thirteen years old. When he arrived in the U.S., he entered Curtis High School on Staten Island, New York. He played on the Curtis soccer team, spending two seasons as the team captain. However, he did not confine himself to high school soccer, but also played for the professional Brooklyn St. Mary's Celtic of the American Soccer League (ASL). In 1938, Brooklyn went to the National Challenge Cup where the team lost the home and away series to Chicago Sparta, 8–0 on aggregate. Hynes came on as a substitute in the game in Chicago. After the National Cup, Hynes moved to Swedish F.C. which played in the National Soccer League of New York. In 1940, Swedish F.C. won both the league and cup titles. They repeated the cup title in 1941, the same year that Hynes moved back to the ASL where he joined the New York Americans. While Hynes began his career as an amateur, he received a nominal payment for games and in 1939 the president of USSF declared Hynes and fellow Swedish F.C. player, Gene Olaff, to be professionals.

Hynes spent only two years with the Americans before joining the U.S. Army's 80th Division during World War II. He received a Purple Heart for his service. Despite significant wounds received during the Battle of the Bulge, Hynes recovered and rejoined the Americans with whom he played until 1952. He then signed with Brookhattan, but in 1954, he moved across town to Brooklyn Hakoah. In 1956, he was named the ASL MVP. The next season, Hakoah won the ASL championship. Despite these achievements, Hynes moved back to Brookhattan in 1957. He was once again the league MVP and second on the league's scoring list. In 1959, Hynes made one last move, this time to Colombo, an expansion ASL club in Brooklyn. Hynes both played and coached Colombo, but the team lasted only the 1959–1960 season before folding. Despite being a first year team, Colombo won the ASL championship. By this time Hynes legs were failing and a fifth operation on his knees led him to retire from playing professionally.

== National team ==
Hynes earned four caps with the U.S. national team when he was selected for the squad which competed in the 1949 NAFC Championship. That year, the cup was used as the North American regional qualification tournament for the 1950 FIFA World Cup. The U.S. finished second out of the three teams and qualified for the World Cup finals. However, Hynes was not selected for the finals team after the New York Times published remarks Hynes had made criticizing USSF's player selection process.

== Post-playing career ==
After retiring from playing, Hynes was both a high school and collegiate referee and coach. His coaching stints included: St. Charles Parish S.I. Youth Soccer 1980, Monsignor Farrell High School S.I. Varsity Soccer coach 1982–1985, Wagner College. He also coached his old National Soccer League of New York team, Swedish F.C.

In 1977, Hynes was inducted into the National Soccer Hall of Fame.

In 1997, the Eastern New York State Soccer Association inducted Hynes into its Hall of Fame.

In 2001, Hynes suffered a mini-stroke on Thanksgiving. He died on 3 August 2013, at the age of 92 in Staten Island, New York.

== See also ==
- List of United States men's international soccer players born outside the United States
