= Pasquale Pepe =

Italian politician (born 1975)

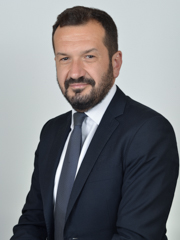
- Pepe in 2018

Member of the Senate
- In office 23 March 2018 – 12 October 2022
- Constituency: Basilicata – P01

Personal details
- Born: 4 February 1975 (age 51) Tolve, Italy
- Party: Lega (since 2018)

Pasquale Pepe (born 4 February 1975) is an Italian politician serving as vice president of Basilicata since 2024. From 2018 to 2022, he was a member of the Senate. He served as mayor of Tolve from 2005 to 2010 and from 2015 to 2024.
