= 1987 National Challenge Cup =

- Dewar Challenge Cup

Tournament details
- Country: United States

Final positions
- Champions: Club España
- Runners-up: Mitre Eagles
- 1988 CONCACAF Champions' Cup: Mitre Eagles

The 1987 National Challenge Cup, now called the Lamar Hunt U.S. Open Cup, is a single-elimination tournament in American soccer. The tournament is the oldest ongoing national soccer competition in the U.S. and is currently open to all United States Soccer Federation affiliated teams, from amateur adult club teams to the professional clubs of Major League Soccer.

== Bracket ==
Semifinals
TX	Dallas Mean Green	0
DC/VA	Club España	3
WA	Seattle Mitre Eagles	5 (AET)
MO	St. Louis Busch Seniors	4

Finals
DC/VA	Club España	0 (3)
WA	Seattle Mitre Eagles	0 (2)

== Results ==
The Results are given below

=== National Semifinals ===
(St. Louis Soccer Park – Fenton, Mo.)
June 20 Club España (DC/VA) 3:0 Dallas Mean Green (North TX)
June 20 Seattle Mitre Eagles (WA) 5:4 (AET) St. Louis Busch SC (MO)

=== Final ===
June 21 Club España (DC/VA) 0:0 (3:2 PKs) Seattle Mitre Eagles (WA)
