= United Soccer Coaches Hall of Fame =

- Former name: NSCAA Hall of Fame
- Established: 1991
- Location: Kansas City, Missouri
- Type: College sports hall of fame
- President: Charlie Slagle
- Website: HOF

The United Soccer Coaches Hall of Fame is a non-profit institution established in 1991 that honors college soccer achievements in the United States. Induction into the hall is widely considered the highest honor in American college soccer.

== Inductees ==
As of 2022, there are over 70 inductees in the United Soccer Coaches Hall of Fame.

== See also ==
- National Soccer Hall of Fame
- United Soccer Coaches
