= Myron Worobec =

Ukrainian-American soccer player (1944–2023)

Myron S. Worobec
Personal information
- Date of birth: October 26, 1944
- Place of birth: Austria
- Date of death: 2023 (aged 78–79)
- Height: 5 ft 11 in (1.80 m)
- Position: Full-back

Senior career*
Years	Team	Apps	(Gls)
1962–1965	NJIT Highlanders		
1966–1967	Newark Ukrainian Sitch		

International career
1967, 1968	U.S. Olympic	1	(0)
- * Club domestic league appearances and goals

Myron Worobec (Note: Ukrainian: Мирон Воробець, romanized: Myron Vorobets) was a Ukrainian-American soccer player who earned one cap for the U.S. Olympic Team in 1967. He played in the Pan Am games. A prolific scorer he was named all-East, all-Area, all-America, a member of the U.S. Pan American team and a member of the U.S. Olympic team. MVP of the American Soccer League (Div. 2) in 1966–67.

Myron is a member of the NJIT Soccer Hall of Fame.

Worobec played club soccer for the Newark Ukrainian Sitch.

Worobec was a Ukrainian immigrant to U.S.A.

Worobec lived in St. Louis with three children and six grandchildren. He was active in his grandchildren's soccer teams. Myron played competitive tennis three days a week.
