= Colombo (soccer) =

American soccer club

Colombo was an American soccer club based in Staten Island, New York that was a member of the American Soccer League (ASL). While only in existence for one year, the team took the ASL title under the direction of player-coach, and future National Soccer Hall of Fame inductee, Jack Hynes.

The team was coached by player-coach Jack Hynes, and managed by Peter Castelli.

Before joining the ASL, the team won the Metropolitan District Soccer League title.

== 1959–1960 season ==
Year	League	Reg. season	Playoffs	U.S. Open Cup
1959–60	ASL	1st	Champion	?
