= George Brown (soccer, born 1935) =

American former soccer forward

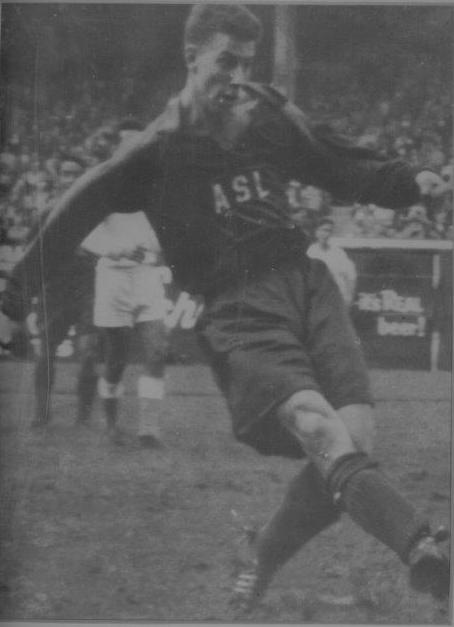

Personal information
- Date of birth: August 19, 1935 (age 91)
- Place of birth: Ealing, England
- Position: Outside right

Senior career*
Years	Team	Apps	(Gls)
1950–1952	Greenport United		
1952	New York Americans		
1953–1955	New York German-Hungarians	66	
1956–1957	Elizabeth Falcons	43	(13)
1958–1959	Chicago Red Lions	4	
1960–1961	Elizabeth Falcons	31	

International career
1957	United States	1	(0)
Medal record
Men's football (soccer)
Representing the United States
Pan American Games
Bronze medal – third place	1959 Chicago	Team competition
- * Club domestic league appearances and goals

George Brown (born August 19, 1935) is a former soccer player who played as a forward. He signed with an amateur team in 1950 at the age of fifteen and was highly successful until suffering a knee injury in 1957. Although he continued to play until 1962, he never regained the full use of his knee. He worked for Exxon, an oil company, for over thirty years, coaching youth soccer throughout the world. Born in England, he played for the United States national team. He is also a member of the National Soccer Hall of Fame.

== Youth ==
Born on August 19, 1935, in Ealing, England, Brown spent his youth in Troon, Scotland before moving to the United States with his family in 1948. His family settled in Greenwich, Connecticut, where he attended Greenwich High School. He graduated in 1952, and in 1955, became a U.S. citizen. Brown's father, Jim, had moved to the U.S. in 1927 when he was nineteen. Jim began his professional career in the U.S. and was a member of the U.S. national team at the 1930 FIFA World Cup. He moved to England in 1932 to sign with Manchester United. In 1948, he returned to the U.S., bringing his son George with him.

== Club career ==
Brown began his club career in 1950, playing with his father's amateur team, Greenport United, in the Connecticut State Amateur League, which his father had founded. In 1951, Greenport won the league title. In 1952, George signed with the New York Americans of the American Soccer League (ASL). However, the team released him due to his small size. He then signed with the New York German-Hungarians of the German American Soccer League (GASL) in 1953. At that time the German-Hungarians, although playing in a small regional league, boasted some of the top U.S. players, including John Souza, Walter Bahr and Joe Maca, all future members of the National Soccer Hall of Fame. This collection of talent paid off for the German-Hungarians as they took three consecutive league titles and the 1956 New York State Cup. In 1953, Brown was the league's MVP. As Brown proved himself in the GASL, the New York Americans tried to sign him but, having been turned down earlier, he refused. Instead, in 1957, he joined the Elizabeth Falcons, also known as the Polish Falcons, of the ASL. However, he tore the anterior cruciate ligament in his left knee during the season. Even with an injury shortened season, he led the ASL with thirteen goals. He began the 1957–1958 season, but was unable to play any significant time. With a professional career no longer possible, Brown was forced to look towards other fields.

== National team ==
On April 4, 1957, Brown earned his only cap with the U.S. national team in a 6–0 loss to Mexico in a World Cup qualifier. He was also a member of the U.S. team at the 1959 Pan American Games. While the U.S. took third place, Brown contributed little due to his lingering knee injury.

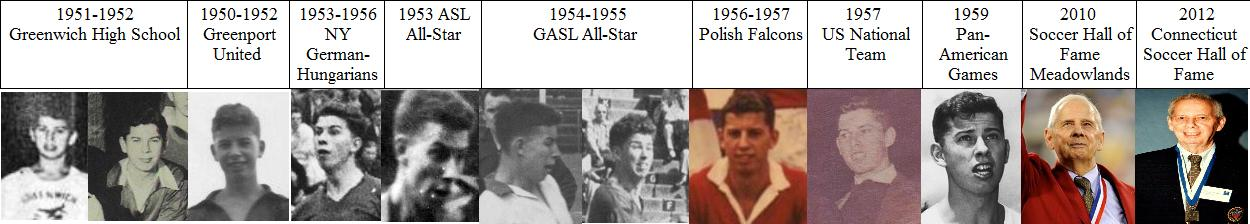

== Army ==
Brown was drafted into the U.S. Army in 1958. While stationed in Indianapolis, Indiana, he played with the Chicago Red Lions. In 1960, upon completion of his service he decided to enter college.

== College ==
In 1960, he entered the University of Bridgeport, a small college but a soccer powerhouse, located in Bridgeport, Connecticut. While he entered school on an athletic scholarship his previous affiliation with professional soccer prevented him from playing collegiate soccer. Instead, he continued to play part-time with the Falcons when not in school. In order to pay for his education, Brown coached the school's freshman soccer and varsity tennis teams. He later earned a master's degree from Columbia University.

== Non-soccer career ==
After graduating from Bridgeport, Exxon hired Brown as a human resource manager and he would remain with the company until his retirement. During his career with the oil company, he travelled extensively throughout the United States and the Middle East. He took this opportunity to help build the sport through coaching and league administration. After retiring from Exxon, he and his wife owned tourist cottages in Cape Breton Nova Scotia, Canada. In 1999, they moved to Oneonta, New York, where they both became integral parts of the National Soccer Hall of Fame, George by serving on the Hall's board of directors and his wife Peggy by serving as Archive Manager. During his tenure on the board (2000–2008) Brown was a member of the executive committee (Secretary) and Finance Committee. He established and chaired the Eligibility and Awards Committee for all 8 years. While serving as chair he spearheaded a complete revision of eligibility rules and voting policies and procedures. He also initiated the Hall's newsletter, "The Hall of Famer", which he edited and published. In 2006 Brown served one full year as the Hall's interim president during which he oversaw the biggest induction in Hall history which featured the induction of Mia Hamm and Julie Foudy.

== Coaching ==
Brown gained his first coaching experience just after graduating from high school when he returned to coach his alma mater to a County Championship in 1955. Later, when an employee of Exxon, he coached youth soccer in Houston, Colorado and New Jersey. He also helped develop soccer associations in Houston and Colorado. After he retired, he and his wife operated tourist cottages in Nova Scotia. Brown continued to coach youth soccer, even in retirement and in 1993, he led the local Cabot Junior/Senior High School girls soccer team to the Provincial Championship.

Brown was inducted into the National Soccer Hall of Fame in 1995. He and his father, Jim Brown, are the only father and son who have been inducted, as Players, into the Hall of Fame. Both he and George were also inducted into the Connecticut Soccer Hall of Fame and the New England Soccer Hall of Fame.

== See also ==
- List of Scottish football families
- List of United States men's international soccer players born outside the United States
