= Newark Falcons =

Former association football club

The Newark Falcons were an American soccer club based in Newark, New Jersey that was a member of the American Soccer League. The club was previously known as Elizabeth Falcons, based in Elizabeth, New Jersey, and for a season as Falcons-Warsaw. After the 1958–59 season, the club became simply Falcons S.C. and became known as Falcons-Warsaw before the 1962–63 season. After the 1963–64 season, the team became the Newark. The team disbanded during the 1966–67 season.

== Year-by-year Elizabeth ==
Year	Division	League	Reg. season	Playoffs	U.S. Open Cup
1954/55	N/A	ASL	5th	No playoff	?
1955/56	N/A	ASL	1st(t)	Lost in playoff	?
1956/57	N/A	ASL	4th	No playoff	?
1957/58	N/A	ASL	6th	No playoff	?
1958/59	N/A	ASL	9th	No playoff	?
1959/60	N/A	ASL	9th	No playoff	?
1960/61	N/A	ASL	2nd	No playoff	?
1961/62	N/A	ASL	6th	No playoff	Quarterfinals
1962/63	N/A	ASL	7th	No playoff	?
1963/64	N/A	ASL	8th	No playoff	?

== Year-by-year Newark ==
Year	Division	League	Reg. season	Playoffs	U.S. Open Cup
1964/65	N/A	ASL	6th	No playoff	?
1965/66	N/A	ASL	10th	No playoff	?
1966/67	2	ASL	5th, South	Disbanded during season	N/A

== See also ==
- Sports in Newark, New Jersey
- George Brown (soccer)
- Elizabeth S.C.
