= Baltimore Pompei =

American soccer club based in Baltimore, Maryland, US

The Baltimore Rockets were an American soccer club based in Baltimore, Maryland that was a member of the American Soccer League.

Before the 1957/58 season the team was renamed Baltimore Pompeii. The club folded after playing six games in the 1960/61 season.

== Year-by-year ==
Year	Division	League	Reg. season	Playoffs	U.S. Open Cup
1953/54	N/A	ASL	7th	No playoff	?
1954/55	N/A	ASL	9th	No playoff	?
1955/56	N/A	ASL	9th	No playoff	?
1956/57	N/A	ASL	8th	No playoff	?
1957/58	N/A	ASL	3rd	No playoff	Runner-up
1958/59	N/A	ASL	5th	No playoff	?
1959/60	N/A	ASL	5th	No playoff	Quarterfinals
1960/61	N/A	ASL	9th	No playoff	N/A
