= List of St. Louis Soccer League seasons =

Seasons of the early professional soccer league based out of St. Louis, Missouri

The following is a list of seasons for the St. Louis Soccer League. The league ran from 1915 to 1938 was America's only professional soccer league at the time of foundation. This list also includes seasons from 1907 to 1915 for the St. Louis Soccer Football League.

== 1907–08 St. Louis Soccer Football League ==
=== League standings ===
Place	Team	GP	W	L	T	Points
1	Innisfails	17	9	2	6	24
2	St. Matthew	16	6	4	6	18
3	St. Teresa	16	6	7	3	15
4	Thistles of Bend, IL	17	3	11	3	9

== 1908–09 St. Louis Soccer Football League ==
=== League table ===
Place	Team	GP	W	L	T	GF	GA	Points
1	St. Leo's	18	12	2	4	39	14	28
2	St. Teresa	18	7	4	7	23	20	21
3	West Ends	18	4	7	7	12	17	15
4	Thistles	18	1	11	6	8	31	8

== 1909–10 St. Louis Soccer League ==
=== Overview ===
St. Leo's won the 1909–10 Athletic Park League. The weeks leading up to the 1909–10 season saw the arrival of the Pilgrims club from England. This team, on a tour of the United States, played several games against local opponents. The season began the first week of November 1909. All games were played at Athletic Park which used to sit at the intersection of Garrison Avenue and Market Street.

=== League standings ===
Place	Team	GP	W	L	T	GF	GA	Points
1	St. Leo's	15	6	1	8	23	14	20
2	St. Teresa	15	6	4	5	25	18	17
3	Blue Bells	16	6	5	5	19	17	15
4	Innisfails	15	3	10	2	10	28	8

== 1910–11 St. Louis Soccer League ==
=== League standings ===
Place	Team	GP	W	L	T	GF	GA	Points
1	St. Leo's	17	10	4	3	41	22	23
2	Columbus Club	17	5	5	7	24	25	17
3	Innisfails	17	7	9	1	24	30	15
4	Blue Bells	17	4	8	5	14	26	13

== 1911–12 St. Louis Soccer League ==
=== League standings ===
Final league standings for the 1911-12 St. Louis Soccer League.

Place	Team	GP	W	L	T	GF	GA	Points
1	St. Leo's	15	11	2	2	34	15	24
2	Innisfails	15	8	4	3	29	16	19
3	Irish American A.C.	15	4	9	2	11	24	10
4	Columbus Club	15	2	10	3	12	31	7

== 1912–13 St. Louis Soccer League ==
League standings for the 1912–13 season as of December 23, 1912 for the Athletic Park League. The St. Leo's team withdrew in January and were replaced by Compton Hills. The League reset and started anew on January 26, 1913.

=== League standings ===
Place	Team	GP	W	L	T	GF	GA	Points
1	St. Leo's	10	7	2	1	19	10	15
2	Innisfails	11	6	3	2	15	10	13
3	Columbus Club	10	3	6	1	10	15	7
4	Business Men's A.C.	10	2	7	1	12	21	5

== 1913–14 St. Louis Soccer League season ==
This season, the league experienced a split caused by St. Leo's success the past few seasons. St. Leo's was the only fully professional team in the league which led to its domination. When the other teams attempted to ban professionals, St. Leo's left the SLSL and set up the St. Louis Football League playing out of Athletic Park. The other teams formed the St. Louis Soccer League playing out of Robison Park.

=== Athletic Park League ===
Place	Team	GP	W	L	T	GF	GA	Points
1	St. Leo's	13	11	0	2	32	1	24
2	Ben Millers	13	7	4	2	21	13	16
3	Columbia A.C.	13	4	8	1	11	35	9
4	Rock Church A.C.	13	1	11	1	9	27	3

=== Robison Park League ===
Place	Team	GP	W	L	T	GF	GA	Points
1	Columbus Club	20	14	6	0	40	24	28
2	Innisfails	20	9	6	5	36	27	23
3	St. Teresa	20	6	10	4	20	35	16
4	Athletics	20	5	12	3	23	33	13

== 1914–15 St. Louis Soccer League seasons ==
The St. Louis Soccer League had split into two competing leagues, the Federal Park League and the Robison League, before the 1913–14 season. This season, the Robison League played two halves with a mid-winter break. At the end of the season, the champions from each league played against each other for the city championship.

=== Federal Park League ===
Place	Team	GP	W	L	T	Points
1	St. Leo's	13	10	1	2	22
2	Ben Millers	13	8	3	2	18
3	Columbia A.C.	10	3	7	3	9
4	Rock Church A.C.	13	1	10	2	4

=== Robison League ===
Innisfails won the league title with 20 points over Columbus Club which had 18 points.

==== First half ====
Place	Team	GP	W	L	T	Points
1	Innisfails	9	6	2	1	13
2	Columbus Club	9	4	4	1	9
3	St. Teresa	9	2	3	4	8
4	Manewals	9	2	5	2	6

==== Second half ====
Place	Team	GP	W	L	T	Points
1	Columbus Club	5	4	0	1	9
2	Innisfails	5	3	1	1	7
3	St. Theresa's	5	1	3	1	3
4	Manewals	5	0	4	1	0

=== City championship ===
Innisfails defeated St. Leo's. The first game of the three-game series ended in a 2–2 tie with Innisfails taking the second game, 4–2. The third game never materialized because of conflicting events and unavailability of players.

== 1915–16 St. Louis Soccer League ==
Final league standings for the 1915-16 St. Louis Soccer League.

=== League standings ===
Place	Team	GP	W	L	T	GF	GA	Points
1	Ben Millers	20	12	5	3	45	22	27
2	Innisfails	19	7	6	6	25	23	20
3	Naval Reserve F.C.	20	4	8	8	25	36	16
4	St. Leo's	19	4	8	7	15	39	15

== 1916–17 St. Louis Soccer League ==
The St. Louis Soccer League was reestablished this season after the league had split into two competing blocks of teams during the previous two seasons.

=== League standings ===
Place	Team	GP	W	L	T	Points
1	Ben Millers	20	10	8	2	22
2	Innisfails	20	9	8	3	21
3	St. Leo's	20	8	8	4	20
4	Naval Reserves	20	7	10	3	17

== 1917–18 St. Louis Soccer League ==
Final league standings for the 1917-18 St. Louis Soccer League.

=== League standings ===
Place	Team	GP	W	L	T	GF	GA	Points
1	Ben Millers	17	9	5	3	33	26	21
2	St. Leo's	17	7	4	6	36	28	20
3	Innisfails	17	5	6	6	23	27	16
4	Naval Reserves	17	2	8	7	18	29	11

== 1918–19 St. Louis Soccer League ==
Final league standings for the 1918-19 St. Louis Soccer League.

=== League standings ===
Place	Team	GP	W	L	T	GF	GA	Points
1	Scullin Steels	21	10	7	4	31	27	24
2	Innisfails	21	9	8	4	36	27	22
3	St. Louis Screw	21	8	8	5	28	36	21
4	Ben Millers	21	5	9	7	30	40	17

== 1919–20 St. Louis Soccer League ==
The season concluded with Ben Millers and Innisfails tied at 23 points each. A one-game playoff was needed to break the tie which was won by the Ben Millers.

=== League standings ===
Place	Team	GP	W	L	T	Points
1	Ben Millers	21	8	6	7	23
2	Innisfails	21	10	8	3	23
3	St. Louis Screw	21	8	9	4	20
4	Scullins Steel	21	7	10	4	18

== 1920–21 St. Louis Soccer League ==
Final league standings for the 1920-21 St. Louis Soccer League.

=== League standings ===
Place	Team	GP	W	L	T	GF	GA	Points
1	Scullin Steels	17	9	5	3	38	31	26
2	Ben Millers	17	8	3	6	28	31	22
3	St. Louis Screw	22	6	7	9	23	23	21
4	Innisfails	22	6	9	7	21	25	19

== 1921–22 St. Louis Soccer League ==
Final league standings for the 1921-22 St. Louis Soccer League.

=== League standings ===
Place	Team	GP	W	L	T	GF	GA	Points
1	Scullin Steels	21	10	6	5	40	28	25
2	DeAndreis	21	9	7	5	36	33	23
3	Ben Millers	21	8	7	6	37	41	22
4	St. Louis Screw	21	4	11	6	28	39	14

== 1922–23 St. Louis Soccer League ==
Final league standings for the 1922-23 St. Louis Soccer League.

=== League standings ===
Place	Team	GP	W	L	T	GF	GA	Points
1	Vesper-Buicks	17	8	4	5	28	16	22
2	Scullin Steels	17	5	5	7	20	21	17
3	Hoover Sweepers	17	5	5	7	21	25	17
4	Ben Millers	17	4	8	5	28	35	13

== 1923–24 St. Louis Soccer League ==
Final league standings for the 1923-24 St. Louis Soccer League.

=== League standings ===
Place	Team	GP	W	L	T	GF	GA	Points
1	Vesper-Buicks	13	9	2	2	30	15	20
2	Barrett Hoovers	13	6	4	3	28	20	15
3	Scullin Steels	13	3	3	4	17	22	10
4	Ben Millers	13	2	8	4	23	35	7

== 1924–25 St. Louis Soccer League ==
Final league standings for the 1924-25 St. Louis Soccer League.

=== League standings ===
Place	Team	GP	W	L	T	GF	GA	Points
1	Ben Millers	18	11	4	3	54	26	25
2	Vesper-Buicks	18	10	4	4	32	25	24
3	Scullin Steels	18	4	7	7	25	34	15
4	Raticans	18	2	12	4	19	45	8

=== Top Goal Scorers ===
Rank	Scorer	Club	GP	G
1	Pee-Wee Fitzgerald	Ben Millers		19
2	Beano Balam	Ben Millers		15
3	Jimmy Dunn	Ben Millers		11
4	Ed Hart	Scullin Steels		8
4	Dutch Gockel	Vesper-Buicks		8
6	Raphael Tracey	Vesper-Buicks		7
7	Ed Becker	Vesper-Buicks		6
8	George Schemel	Raticans		4
8	J. Burke	Scullin Steels		4

== 1925–26 St. Louis Soccer League ==
=== League standings ===
Place	Team	GP	W	L	T	GF	GA	Points
1	Ben Millers	14	8	3	3	42	31	19
2	Vesper-Buicks	14	7	4	3	40	27	17
3	Raticans	14	4	6	4	27	39	12
4	Wellstones	14	3	9	2	30	42	8

=== Top goal scorers ===
Rank	Scorer	Club	GP	G
1	Jimmy Dunn	Ben Millers		15
2	Buddy Brengle	Raticans		8
3	Harry Ratican	Raticans		7
3	Joe Hand	Vesper-Buicks		7
3	Beano Ballam	Ben Millers		7
6	Ed Becker	Vesper-Buicks		6
6	Ed Hart	Wellstone's		6
8	Raphael Tracey	Vesper-Buicks / Ben Millers		5
8	George Corrigan	Wellstones		5
8	Ed Hanson	Vesper-Buicks		5
8	Al McHenry	Raticans		5

== 1926–27 St. Louis Soccer League ==
=== League standings ===
Place	Team	GP	W	L	T	GF	GA	Points
1	Ben Millers	12	8	3	1	34	22	17
2	Wellston	12	7	3	2	36	22	16
3	White Banner	12	4	6	2	23	33	10
4	Raticans	12	1	8	3	21	35	5
5	Chicago Sparta*	4	2	1	1	8	7	5

- Chicago Sparta withdrew after four games.

=== Top Goal Scorers ===
Rank	Scorer	Club	GP	G
1	Ed Hart	Wellstones		10
2	Joe Hennessy	Ben Millers		8
3	Lou Ahrens	Wellstones		7
4	Jimmy Dunn	Wellstones		6
4	Al McHenry	Raticans		6
4	E. Thumm	White Banner		6
4	George Corrigan	Wellstone's		6
8	Tom Erbe	Ben Millers		5
8	Bochnicek	Raticans		5
8	Buddy Brengle	Raticans		4
11	Harry Ratican	Raticans		3
11	George Schweppe	Ben Millers		3

== 1935–36 St. Louis Soccer League ==
This season the St. Louis Soccer League, headed by president Phil A. Riley, decided to try a new format. The idea was to make an eight team league instead of the usual four with 50 cent admission playing out of two fields. Four 'old pros' comprising the national champion Centrals, (Johnny) Marre's, Ben Millers, and Hellrung Grimms would be combined with four 'graduates' in the German Sport Club, George McGann's Schumachers, Ed Delaney's Hermanns, and Sociedad Espanola (Spanish Sport Club). The two fields used were Sportsman's Park and South Side Park, aka National Softball Park. The referees enlisted were Oscar Mossman, Jimmy Dunn, Ribby Murphy, and Charley LaBarge. The league played three rounds beginning on October 6 before problems arose in the fourth week. The standings for the first three weeks are below.

St. Louis 8		Pts	GP	W	L	T	GF	GA	Dif	Perc
1	Democrats	5	3	2	0	1	12	4	+8	.833
2	Spanish Sports Club	5	3	2	0	1	9	2	+7	.833
3	H&G	4	3	2	1	0	9	6	+3	.667
4	Marres	3	3	1	1	1	9	6	+3	.500
5	Ben Millers	3	3	1	1	1	5	5	0	.500
6	German	2	3	1	2	0	5	11	-6	.333
7	Hermanns	1	3	0	2	1	2	9	-7	.167
8	Schumachers	1	3	0	2	1	0	8	-8	.167

Beginning with the fourth week (October 27) admission was reduced to 25 cents with ladies free. Two of the games were called off at South Side field because of weather conditions. The games at the other field were played after a delay due to the assumption that the games would also be called off for the same reason. The delay caused the games to be shortened and were played without a break with some players having left as well. It was decided that these games would be considered exhibitions and not count in the standings and the entire round replayed. This never happened because by the next week the Schumachers, Hermanns, and German Sport Club withdrew from the league.

=== St. Louis 5 ===
On November 3, prior games were scratched from the record and the league restarted with five teams: Ben Millers, Hellrung & Grimm, Spanish Sport Club, and St. Louis Soccer Club (formerly Democratic Country Club). In the first round St. Louis Soccer Club toppled Ben Millers 6-1 while Spanish Sport Club shutout Hellrungs 4–0, Marre's had a bye.

=== St. Louis 4 ===
The following week (November 10) the league restarted a third time having returned to four teams and one field. The league would play at National Softball Park while the 'St. Louis 1' soon to be Father Dempsey's Shamrocks would be a league of their own at Sportsman's Park to entertain intercity competition. The next week (November 17) the St. Louis Soccer Club played their first games as the Shamrocks against the Maccabees of Chicago, winning 4–2. The Spanish Club also played their first game as Burke's and went on to win the first half with a perfect record. First half season standings below.

St. Louis 4		Pts	GP	W	L	T	GF	GA	Dif	Perc
1	Burke's	16	8	8	0	0	18	2	+16	1.00
2	H&G	6	8	3	5	0	12	13	-1	.375
3	Marres	6	8	3	5	0	9	14	-5	.375
4	Ben Miller	4	8	2	6	0	8	18	-10	.250

Champion: Burke's Undertakers

=== Shamrocks ===
Last season's 'double winners' as the Centrals began the current season under the sponsorship of the Democratic Country Club only to lose it a month later to become simply the St. Louis Soccer Club. They may have been able to repeat the double but did not participate in the remainder of the league season and finished runner up in the National Challenge Cup competition. When they were competing in the league they were undefeated but found stiff competition from the also undefeated Burke's, the Shamrocks had the edge only in goal differential. Their toughest intercity opponent proved to be Heidelberg. They commenced independent play on November 17 as Father Dempsey's Shamrocks. Their games were played at Sportsman's Park with an admission fee of 55 cents which was more than twice than what the St. Louis league was charging yet they drew many more fans. Below are their results including goal scorers.

- November 17 Shamrocks 4-2 Chicago Maccabee (Patenaude (3), Gonsalves)
- November 24 Shamrocks 2-2 Slavia-Bartunek (Gonsalves)
- December 1 Shamrocks 3-2 Chicago Sparta (Watson, Patenaude, Roe)
- December 8 Shamrocks 2-4 Heidelberg (Gonsalves(2))
- December 15 Shamrocks 7-0 Milwaukee Deutscher SC (Patenaude(3), Gonsalves(3), Watson)
- December 22 Shamrocks 5-1 Cleveland Graphite-Bronze (Patenaude(4), Gonsalves)
- December 29 Shamrocks 4-1 Cleveland Slavia (Garcia, Patenaude(2), Gonsalves)
- January 1 Shamrocks 2-2 Heidelberg (Patenaude, Gonsalves, Lehman(og))
- January 5 Shamrocks 2-0 Heidelberg (Nilsen, Gonsalves)
- January 12 Shamrocks 10-2 Chicago Olympia (Gonsalves(3), Patenaude(2), Roe(2), Nilsen(2), Egan) -game postponed from December 25
- February 23 Shamrocks 3-0 Burke (Patenaude(2), Roe)
- March 8 Shamrocks 3-0 Pittsburgh Avella
