= Billy Watson (soccer) =

American-Scottish footballer

Personal information
- Full name: William Watson
- Place of birth: Scotland
- Place of death: USA
- Position: Half back

Senior career*
Years	Team	Apps	(Gls)
- Ayr United
- Vale of Leven
1925–1926	Coventry City	31	(1)
1928	Bethlehem Steel	3	(0)
1928	New Bedford Whalers	3	(0)
1928–1930	Providence Gold Bugs	113	(6)
1931	Fall River	17	(2)
1931–1932	New Bedford Whalers		
1933–1934	Stix, Baer and Fuller		
1935	→ St. Louis Central Breweries		
1936–1937	→ St. Louis Shamrocks		
1937–	South Side Radio		
- * Club domestic league appearances and goals

Billy Watson was a Scottish-American soccer left half. He began his career in Scotland before moving to England and then the United States where he played in both the American Soccer League and St. Louis Soccer League.

Watson began his career in Scotland playing for Ayr United and Vale of Leven F.C. in the early 1920s. In 1925, he transferred to English club Coventry City F.C. before moving to the United States in 1926. In the spring of 1928, he signed with the Bethlehem Steel of the American Soccer League at the end of the 1927-1928 season as a replacement for injured Bob MacGregor. He played only three games with Bethlehem. He began the 1928-1929 season with the New Bedford Whalers, but was transferred to the Providence Gold Bugs after only three games. In the spring of 1931, he played for Fall River, but moved to back to the Whalers in the summer. In 1932, the Whalers defeated Stix, Baer and Fuller F.C. (SBF) of the St. Louis Soccer League for the 1932 National Challenge Cup title. By that time, the ASL was on its last legs and Alex McNab, New Bedford's captain accepted an offer to move west to SBF where he became a player-coach. He then recruited the core of the New Bedford team, including Watson. Watson would remain in St. Louis for the remainder of his career. In 1933, SBF used these new players to win the 1933 National Challenge Cup, repeating as champions in 1934. The St. Louis teams relied on the sponsorship of local businesses to the extent that they changed names to match their sponsors. As a result, when the Stix, Baer and Fuller department store sold the rights to the team to St. Louis Central Brewery, the team became known as St. Louis Central Breweries F.C., then the St. Louis Shamrocks in 1935. Watson remained with the club through these name changes, winning the 1935 National Challenge Cup and finishing runner up in 1936 and 1937. On 6 February 1938, he signed with South Side Radio, but his teams become obscure after that. He was still actively playing in 1939 when he was part of a St. Louis All-Stars team which played a Scottish F.A. team touring the United States. and was inducted into the St. Louis Soccer Hall of Fame in 1992.
