= Alex McNab =

Scottish-American soccer player and coach

Personal information
- Full name: Alexander McNab
- Date of birth: 27 December 1894
- Place of birth: Gourock, Scotland
- Date of death: 3 April 1960 (aged 65)
- Place of death: St. Louis, Missouri, United States
- Position: Wing forward

Youth career
- Gourock Woodvale

Senior career*
| Years | Team | Apps | (Gls) |
| 1914–1924 | Greenock Morton | 288 | (54) |
| 1924–1928 | Boston Soccer Club | 149 | (35) |
| 1928–1930 | Fall River | 106 | (22) |
| 1931 | → New York Yankees | 7 | (1) |
| 1931–1933 | → New Bedford Whalers | | |
| 1933–1934 | Stix, Baer and Fuller | | |
| 1935 | → St. Louis Central Breweries | | |
| 1936–1937 | → St. Louis Shamrocks | | |
| 1937 | South Side Radio | | |
| 1937–1938 | St. Matthew's | | |
| 1938–1939 | Burke's Undertakers | | |

International career
| 1921 | Scotland | 2 | (0) |

Managerial career
- 1932–1934: Stix, Baer and Fuller
- 1934–1935: St. Louis Central Breweries
- 1935–1937: St. Louis Shamrocks
- * Club domestic league appearances and goals

Alexander McNab (27 December 1894 – 3 April 1960) was a Scottish-American soccer player and coach. He began his career in Scotland before moving to the United States. In the US, he won six consecutive National Challenge Cups with teams from both the American Soccer League and St. Louis Soccer League. He was inducted into the National Soccer Hall of Fame in 2005.

== Scotland ==
=== Greenock Morton ===
McNab began his career with Greenock Morton in 1914, playing nine seasons with the team until his departure for the United States in 1924. On 27 April 1922, Morton won the Scottish Cup, winning in the final against Rangers. In 1924, Morton offered McNab £4 per week. He considered this excessively low, but when he asked for a transfer, the club placed a prohibitively high fee on him to force him to stay in Greenock. When McNab received an offer from the Boston Soccer Club of the American Soccer League to play for £12 per week, McNab immediately left Scotland for the United States.

=== National team ===
McNab earned two caps with the Scotland national team. His first was a 2–0 away win over Ireland on 26 February 1921 and the second was a 3–0 victory over England on 9 April 1921.

== United States ==
=== American Soccer League ===
McNab became an immediate success with the Boston Soccer Club. In 1925, the team defeated the Ben Millers of the St. Louis Soccer League in an unofficial national championship series. After finishing second in the league in 1926 and 1927, Boston finally took the ASL title in 1928 to go with their 1925 and 1927 league cups. By that time, McNab was partnered on Boston's front line with Billy Gonsalves and Bill McPherson, forming what was known as the "golden triangle". In 1928, McNab left Boston for the Fall River Over the next three season, the 'Marksmen' took three league titles as well as the 1930 and 1931 National Challenge Cups. The 1931 Challenge Cup, pitting Fall River against Chicago Sparta was tied after two game, forcing a decisive third game. However, McNab broke his arm the day before the decisive game and Fall River was forced to play with ten men as they had failed to bring substitutes to Chicago. In 1931, the 'Marksmen' merged with the New York Soccer Club to form the New York Yankees. After one season, they moved to New Bedford, becoming the New Bedford Whalers. The Whalers proceeded to win the 1931 and spring 1932 seasons as well as the 1932 National Challenge Cup over Stix, Baer and Fuller F.C. (SBF) of the St. Louis Soccer League.

=== St. Louis ===
The Whalers victory over SBF in the 1932 Challenge Cup brought an offer from the SBF ownership to move west. McNab took the offer, inducing both Gonsalves and McPherson to join him at SBF. They formed the core of a team which took the 1933 and 1934 Challenge Cups. In 1934, St. Louis Central Breweries took over sponsorship of the team, renaming it appropriately enough, St. Louis Central Breweries F.C. In 1935, McNab won his sixth straight Challenge Cup with Central Breweries. That year the team was renamed the St. Louis Shamrocks. However, the Shamrocks withdrew from the SLSL, competing in the St. Louis Major League, the city's second division. In 1936, McNab and his teammates went to yet another National Cup final, falling this time to the Philadelphia German-Americans. In 1937, McNab went to his eighth straight National Cup final, losing this one to the New York Nationals. Following this loss, the Shamrocks where disbanded. McNab then signed with South Side Radio. In December 1937, McNab gained his release from South Side and signed with St. Matthew's of the SLSL, playing the 1937–1938 season with them. On 30 October 1938, he signed with Burke's Undertakers for the 1938–1939 season.

=== Coaching ===
The move to Stix, Baer and Fuller F.C. brought McNab into the coaching ranks. He immediately proved he was as good a coach as a player, taking SBF to two consecutive league and National Challenge Cup titles.

== Non-playing career ==
In addition to playing and coaching soccer, McNab worked as an engineer in Scotland, and as a sporting goods salesman for the Stix, Baer and Fuller department store in St. Louis after retiring from playing.

== National Soccer Hall of Fame ==
The National Soccer Hall of Fame inducted McNab in 2005 as part of a process of recognising significant pre-1950s players. According to the Hall of Fame, "We were aware that in the early decades of the Hall of Fame a number of outstanding players had slipped through the cracks of the selection process. In order to correct these oversights we established a Blue Ribbon panel consisting of historians Colin Jose, Roger Allaway and Hall of Famer Walter Bahr, to review the credentials of all Veterans from the pre-NASL era. Out of a total of 150 players who met the eligibility criteria, the panel unanimously recommended, and the Board approved, the special induction of these five players." McNab was among the five selected.

McNab died in 1960 when he suffered a heart attack playing golf. His son Peter McNab later played in the second American Soccer League.
