= 1935–36 St. Louis Soccer League =

== History ==
This season the St. Louis Soccer League, headed by president Phil A. Riley, decided to try a new format. The idea was to make an eight team league instead of the usual four with 50 cent admission playing out of two fields. Four 'old pros' comprising the national champion Centrals, (Johnny) Marre's, Ben Millers, and Hellrung Grimms would be combined with four 'graduates' in the German Sport Club, George McGann's Schumachers, Ed Delaney's Hermanns, and Sociedad Espanola (Spanish Sport Club). The two fields used were Sportsman's Park and South Side Park, a.k.a. National Softball Park. The referees enlisted were Oscar Mossman, Jimmy Dunn, Ribby Murphy, and Charley LaBarge. The league played three rounds beginning on October 6 before problems arose in the fourth week. The standings for the first three weeks are below.

St. Louis 8		Pts	GP	W	L	T	GF	GA	Dif	Perc
1	Democrats	5	3	2	0	1	12	4	+8	.833
2	Spanish Sports Club	5	3	2	0	1	9	2	+7	.833
3	H&G	4	3	2	1	0	9	6	+3	.667
4	Marres	3	3	1	1	1	9	6	+3	.500
5	Ben Millers	3	3	1	1	1	5	5	0	.500
6	German	2	3	1	2	0	5	11	-6	.333
7	Hermanns	1	3	0	2	1	2	9	-7	.167
8	Schumachers	1	3	0	2	1	0	8	-8	.167

Beginning with the fourth week (October 27) admission was reduced to 25 cents with ladies free. Two of the games were called off at South Side field because of weather conditions. The games at the other field were played after a delay due to the assumption that the games would also be called off for the same reason. The delay caused the games to be shortened and were played without a break with some players having left as well. It was decided that these games would be considered exhibitions and not count in the standings and the entire round replayed. This never happened because by the next week the Schumachers, Hermanns, and German Sport Club withdrew from the league.

=== St. Louis 5 ===
On November 3, prior games were scratched from the record and the league restarted with five teams: Ben Millers, Hellrung & Grimm, Spanish Sport Club, and St. Louis Soccer Club (formerly Democratic Country Club). In the first round St. Louis Soccer Club toppled Ben Millers 6-1 while Spanish Sport Club shutout Hellrungs 4-0, Marre's had a bye.

=== St. Louis 4 ===
The following week (November 10) the league restarted a third time having returned to four teams and one field. The league would play at National Softball Park while the 'St. Louis 1' soon to be Father Dempsey's Shamrocks would be a league of their own at Sportsman's Park to entertain intercity competition. The next week (November 17) the St. Louis Soccer Club played their first games as the Shamrocks against the Maccabees of Chicago, winning 4-2. The Spanish Club also played their first game as Burke's and went on to win the first half with a perfect record. First half season standings below.

St. Louis 4		Pts	GP	W	L	T	GF	GA	Dif	Perc
1	Burke's	16	8	8	0	0	18	2	+16	1.00
2	H&G	6	8	3	5	0	12	13	-1	.375
3	Marres	6	8	3	5	0	9	14	-5	.375
4	Ben Miller	4	8	2	6	0	8	18	-10	.250

Champion: Burke's Undertakers

Following the shrinkage of the league back to four teams, Phil Kavanaugh was elected president of the league on November 26, 1935.

== Shamrocks ==
Last season's 'double winners' as the Centrals began the current season as the Democrats under the sponsorship of the Democratic Country Club only to lose it a month later to become simply the St. Louis Soccer Club. They may have been able to repeat the double but did not participate in the remainder of the league season and finished runner up in the National Challenge Cup competition. When they were competing in the league they were undefeated but found stiff competition from the also undefeated Burke's, the Shamrocks had the edge only in goal differential. Their toughest intercity opponent proved to be Heidelberg. They commenced independent play on November 17 as Father Dempsey's Shamrocks. Their games were played at Sportsman's Park with an admission fee of 55 cents for men, and 25 cents for women and children which was more than twice than what the St. Louis league was charging yet they drew many more fans. Below are their results including goal scorers.

- November 17 Shamrocks 4-2 Chicago Maccabee (Patenaude (3), Gonsalves)
- November 24 Shamrocks 2-2 Slavia-Bartunek (Gonsalves)
- December 1 Shamrocks 3-2 Chicago Sparta (Watson, Patenaude, Roe)
- December 8 Shamrocks 2-4 Heidelberg (Gonsalves(2))
- December 15 Shamrocks 7-0 Milwaukee Deutscher SC (Patenaude(3), Gonsalves(3), Watson)
- December 22 Shamrocks 5-1 Cleveland Graphite-Bronze (Patenaude(4), Gonsalves)
- December 29 Shamrocks 4-1 Cleveland Slavia (Garcia, Patenaude(2), Gonsalves)
- January 1 Shamrocks 2-2 Heidelberg (Patenaude, Gonsalves, Lehman(og))
- January 5 Shamrocks 2-0 Heidelberg (Nilsen, Gonsalves)
- January 12 Shamrocks 10-2 Chicago Olympia (Gonsalves(3), Patenaude(2), Roe(2), Nilsen(2), Egan) -game postponed from December 25
- February 23 Shamrocks 3-0 Burke (Patenaude(2), Roe)
- March 8 Shamrocks 3-0 Pittsburgh Avella
