= 1932 National Challenge Cup =

- Dewar Challenge Cup

Tournament details
- Country: United States
- Dates: 27 December 1931 – 2 April 1932

Final positions
- Champions: New Bedford Whalers (1st title)
- Runners-up: Stix, Baer and Fuller
- Semifinalists: Bricklayers FC; New York Giants

The 1932 National Challenge Cup was the annual open cup held by the United States Football Association now known as the Lamar Hunt U.S. Open Cup.

== Eastern Division ==
First round
January 10 - New York
New York Giants	7
New York Americans	2
January 10, 17
Canton FC	2-1
BS Baltimore	2-3
January 10 - Newark
Newark Americans	4
Newark Portuguese	1
January 10 - Trenton
Trenton Highlanders	4
Fairhill F.C.	0
January 10 - Brooklyn
Hakoah All-Stars	5
Yonkers Thistle	0
January 10 - Brooklyn
German Hungarian	6
Buffalo Germans	1
January 17 - New Bedford
New Bedford Whalers	5
Boston Bears	1
January 17 - Thornton
Pawtucket Rangers	2
Victoria Mills	1

Second round
January 24 - New York
New York Giants	4
BS Baltimore	2
January 24 - Newark
Newark Americans	2
Trenton Highlanders	0
January 24 - Brooklyn
Hakoah All-Stars	4
German Hungarian	1
January 23 - Pawtucket
New Bedford Whalers	1
Pawtucket Rangers	0

Semi-finals
February 7 - New York
New York Giants	6
Newark Americans	1
February 14 - New York
Hakoah All-Stars	0
New Bedford Whalers	1

Final
February 21 - New York
New York Giants	2
New Bedford Whalers	5

== Western Division ==
First round
January 3 - St. Louis
Stix	3
Ben Millers	1
January 1 - St. Louis
Kavanaughs	8
Andersons	3
January 3 - Chicago
Sparta ABA	3
Deutscher Sports Club	0
Chicago
Swedish Americans
Carpenters
January 3 - Detroit
Workers A.C.	4
Detroit Ramblers	3
December 27 - Chicago
Chicago Bricklayers	4
Norwegian Americans	3
January 3 - Cleveland
Rosenblum Slavia	3
Morgan F.C.	2
January 10 - Cleveland
Cleveland Shamrocks	2
Bruell Hungarian	2

Second round
January 24 - St. Louis
Stix	2
Kavanaughs	1
February 14 - Chicago
Sparta ABA	2
Swedish Americans	1
February 14 - Detroit
Workers A.C.	1
Chicago Bricklayers	2
February 14 - Cleveland
Rosenblum Slavia	7
Cleveland Shamrocks	0

Semi-finals
February 28 - St. Louis
Stix	1
Sparta ABA	0
February 28 - Chicago
Chicago Bricklayers	1
Rosenblum Slavia	0

Final
March 6, 13, 20
Stix	4^{a}
Chicago Bricklayers	4

a) aggregate after 3 games, Stix advance 2 games to 1

== Final ==
=== First game ===
March 27, 1932

Stix, Baer and Fuller F.C. (MO)	3–3 (a.e.t.)	New Bedford Whalers (MA)
Hart 34' (Pastor); O'Reilly 44' (Ahrens); McLean 113' (Pastor)		Nilsen 33' (White); McPherson 78'; Florie 108' (Nilsen)

Sportsman’s Park, St. Louis, Missouri
Attendance: 7,181
Referee: Jimmy MacFarlane

=== Second game ===
April 3, 1932

Stix, Baer and Fuller F.C. (MO)	2–5	New Bedford Whalers (MA)
Ahrens 59' (Benoist); McLean 74' (Ahrens)		White 57'; Nilsen; Gonsalves (McNab); McPherson 81'; Florie

Sportsman’s Park, St. Louis, Missouri
Attendance: 7,371
Referee: Jimmy MacFarlane
