= 1936 National Challenge Cup =

- Dewar Challenge Cup

Tournament details
- Country: United States
- Dates: 19 January – 3 May 1936

Final positions
- Champions: Philadelphia German-Americans (1st title)
- Runners-up: St. Louis Shamrocks
- Semifinalists: St. Mary's Celtic; Heidelberg S.C.

The 1936 National Challenge Cup was the annual open cup held by the United States Football Association now known as the Lamar Hunt U.S. Open Cup. This edition featured the fifth of six consecutive final appearances for Alex McNab's team. The Shamrocks not participating in their local league that year were playing inter city matches with top competition primarily from Cleveland, Chicago and Detroit. One of their only losses during the season was to Heidelberg, eventual Western Final opponents of the Shamrocks. Early in the season Heidelberg took the first game of a three-game set, the second match ended in a draw and McNab's men evened up the series by pulling out a victory in the third game. Both teams eventually made their way to the Western Final, Heidelberg led by the lone scorer for the USA at the 1934 World Cup Aldo Donelli. The Shamrocks with their World Cup veterans including William Lehman, Billy Gonsalves, Werner Nilsen, and Bert Patenaude overcame the Pennsylvanians with a 3-2 aggregate over two games. The final showcased still further US nationals. The Philadelphia German-Americans roster boasted a quartet of their own including Bill Fiedler, Al Harker, Peter Pietras, and Francis Ryan. After a two all draw in the first leg of the final in St. Louis, Philly took home the trophy by blanking the Shamrocks 3–0 in the second leg.

== Eastern Division ==
First round
March 7 - New York
New York Americans | 2
Brooklyn St. Mary's Celtic | 3
March 1 - Fall River
Liberal A.C. | 0
Santo Christo | 2
March 1,8,15 - New York
Brookhattan | 9 ^{a}
Brooklyn Hispano | 8
February 2 - New York
Hatikvoh | 1
German Hungarians | 2
February 23/March 1 - Newark
Scots Americans | 0-2
Trenton Highlanders | 0-0
February 2 - Newark
Irish Americans | 2
Newark Germans | 1
March 1 - Philadelphia
German-Americans | 5
Budd AA | 0
February 16 - Baltimore
Baltimore Canton | 5
Stonewall Democratic | 3

Quarter-finals
March 22 - New York
St. Mary's Celtic | 4
Santo Christos | 1
March 22 - New York
Brookhattan | 2
German Hungarians | 0
March 22 - Newark
Scots Americans | 2
Irish-Americans | 0
March 15 - Philadelphia
German-Americans | 3
Baltimore Canton | 2

Semi-finals
March 29 - New York
St. Mary's Celtic | 2
Brookhattan | 1
April 5 - Newark
Scots Americans | 0
German-Americans | 1

Final
April 12, 19
St. Mary's Celtic | 0-1
German-Americans | 2-0

== Western Division ==
First round
January 19/February 2 - St. Louis
Shamrocks | 0-6
Hellrung & Grimm | 0-1
January 19 - Cleveland
Slavia Bartunek | 2
Highland Park Chryslers | 1
January 12 - St. Louis
Marres | 4
Burke's Undertakers | 2
March 8 - Milwaukee
Vienna IAC | 5
Bayern Schlitz | 4
February 23 - Chicago
Sparta Garden City | 6
Ben Millers | 0
January 19 - Chicago
Olympia | 3
Maccabee | 2
February 2 - Pittsburgh
Heidelberg | 4
Curry Silver Tops | 0
January 26 - Rochester
Rochester Celtics | 0
Kodak Park | 4

Quarter-finals
March 1 - St. Louis
Shamrocks | 4
Slavia Bartunek | 3
March 15 - St. Louis
Marres | 6
Vienna IAC | 3
March 1 - Chicago
Sparta Garden City | 2
Olympia | 1
February 23 - Pittsburgh
Heidelberg | 4
Kodak Park | 1

Semi-finals
March 22 - St. Louis
Shamrocks | 2
Marres | 1
March 22 - Chicago
Sparta Garden City | 1
Heidelberg | 2

Final
March 29, April 5
Shamrocks | 1-2
Heidelberg | 1-1

a) aggregate after three games

== Final ==
=== First game ===
April 26, 1936

| St. Louis Shamrocks (MO) | 2–2 | Philadelphia German-Americans (PA) |
|---|---|---|
| Nilsen 8', 68' (Patenaude) | | Richards 10'; Fiedler 89' (Regan) |

Walsh Memorial Stadium, St. Louis, Missouri
Attendance: 3,400
Referee: Mike Boylan

=== Second game ===
May 3, 1936

| Philadelphia German-Americans (PA) | 3–0 | St. Louis Shamrocks (MO) |
|---|---|---|
| Nemchik 25', 34'; Richards 69' |

Rifle Club Grounds, Philadelphia, Pennsylvania
Attendance: 8,000
Referee: Gordon

== Sources ==
- St. Louis Post-Dispatch
