= 1938 National Challenge Cup =

- Dewar Challenge Cup

Tournament details
- Country: United States
- Dates: 16 January – 24 April 1938

Final positions
- Champions: Sparta Garden City (1st title)
- Runners-up: St. Mary's Celtic
- Semifinalists: Castle Shannon; New York Americans

The 1938 National Challenge Cup was the annual open cup held by the United States Football Association now known as the Lamar Hunt U.S. Open Cup. Scheduled as follows: First Round on or before January 16, Second Round on or before January 30, Quarterfinals February 13, Semifinals East February 26, 27, West February 20, 27.

== Eastern Division ==
First round
January 16 - New York
New York Americans	4
Brooklyn First Germans	2
January 16 - Newark
Irish-Americans	3
Bethlehem Hungaria	5
January 23 - New York
Brookhattan	4
Hatikvoh	1
January 30/February 6, 13
Lusitania Recreation	6
Ponta Delgada	7^{a}
January 16, 22 - New York
Brooklyn Hispano	1–1
Brooklyn St. Mary's Celtic	1–4
January 16 - Baltimore
Baltimore SC	2
Budd AA	1
January 16, 22 - Philadelphia
First German American	3–2
Philadelphia Passon	3–0
January 16 - Clifton
Paterson Caledonian	1
Scots Americans	0

Quarter-finals
January 30 - New York
New York Americans	4
Bethlehem Hungaria	1
February 20 - New York
Brookhattan	7
Ponta Delgada S.C.	0
January 30 - New York
Brooklyn St. Mary's Celtic	7
Baltimore S.C.	1
January 30 - Philadelphia
First German American	5
Paterson Caledonian	3

Semi-finals
February 27 - New York
New York Americans	4
Brookhattan	3
February 27/March 12 - New York
Brooklyn St. Mary's Celtic	1–1
First German American	1–0

Final
March 27/April 2 - New York
New York Americans	2–0
Brooklyn St. Mary's Celtic	1–3

== Western Division ==
First round
January 16 - St. Louis
St. Patricks	2
South Side Radio	3
January 30 - St. Louis
Burkes	5
St. Matthews	4
January 16 - Pittsburgh
German Sports Club	2
Heidelberg	0
January 23 - Cleveland
Slavia Bartunek	3
Cecil Merchants	1
January 16 - St. Louis
Shamrocks
Sparta ABA	w/o
February 13 - Detroit
Scottish Thistles	5
Ekhardt & Becker	1
January 16 - Chicago
Maccabee	2
American Nickeloid	0
January 16 - Milwaukee
Milwaukee Schlitz	6
Racine Deutscher	4

Quarter-finals
February 6 - St. Louis
South Side Radio	1
Burkes	0
January 30 - Pittsburgh
German Sports Club	3
Slavia Bartunek	0
February 20 - Chicago
Sparta ABA	5
Scottish Thistles	0
January 30 - Chicago
Maccabee	2
Milwaukee Schlitz	1

Semi-finals
February 20 - St. Louis
South Side Radio	2
German Sports Club	4
February 27 - Chicago
Sparta ABA	1
Maccabee	0

Final
March 13, 20
German Sports Club	1-1
Sparta ABA	2-3

a) aggregate after 3 games

== Final ==
=== First game ===
April 17, 1938

Sparta ABA (IL)	3–0	St. Mary's Celtic (NY)
Trimmel; McDermott; Wolf

Sparta Stadium, Chicago, Illinois
Attendance: 4,000
Referee: W.J. Arms

=== Second game ===
April 24, 1938

St. Mary's Celtic (NY)	2–3	Sparta ABA (IL)
J. McEwan; W. McEwan		Trimmel; McDermott,

Starlight Park, The Bronx, New York
Attendance: 10,000
Referee: M.L. Braun

== Sources ==
- St. Louis Post-Dispatch
