= Raphael Tracey =

American soccer playe (1904–1975)

Ralph Tracy

Personal information
- Full name: Raphael Tracy
- Date of birth: February 6, 1904
- Place of birth: St. Louis, Missouri, U.S.
- Date of death: March 6, 1975 (aged 71)
- Place of death: St. Louis, Missouri, U.S.
- Positions: Defender; midfielder

Senior career*
Years	Team	Apps	(Gls)
1925	St. Louis Vesper Buick	?	(7)
1926–	Ben Millers		

International career
1930	United States	3	(0)
Medal record
Men's soccer
Representing United States
FIFA World Cup
Third place	1930 Uruguay
- * Club domestic league appearances and goals

Raphael “Ralph” Tracy (Note: Sometimes misspelled as Ralf Tracy or Tracey) (February 6, 1904 – March 6, 1975) was an American soccer player. He spent his club career with several teams in St. Louis and played in all three games for the United States national team at the 1930 FIFA World Cup. He is a member of the National Soccer Hall of Fame.

== Club career ==
Tracy was born and raised in St. Louis but spent some time in early years in Gillespie, Illinois playing soccer. He began his club career as a forward with St. Louis Vesper Buick of the St. Louis Soccer League (SLSL) during the 1925 season. While he was the second leading scorer on the team, he was released during the 1925–1926 season. He then signed with the Ben Millers and finished the season with them. He moved to the midfield with the Ben Millers; playing on the team which lost the 1926 National Challenge Cup to Bethlehem Steel. He scored six goals during the 1931–1932 season, tying for sixth in the league.

== National team ==
Tracy earned three caps with the United States national team at the 1930 FIFA World Cup. While the U.S. won the first two games, over Belgium and Paraguay by a 3–0 score in each, they lost to Argentina 6–1 in the semifinals. Tracy broke his leg ten minutes into the game, but he continued to play until half time.

Tracy was inducted into the St. Louis Soccer Hall of Fame in 1973 and the National Soccer Hall of Fame in 1986.
