= Lou Ahrens =

American soccer player

Louis J. Ahrens (1906 – September 3, 1964) was an American soccer forward who spent his entire career in the St. Louis Soccer League.

Ahrens played for Wellstones from at least 1927 until 1929. He scored ten goals for Wellstones during the 1928–1929 season, tying him for third on the goals list. In 1931, he is listed with Stix, Baer and Fuller F.C. In 1932, Stix, Baer and Fuller went to the final of the 1932 National Challenge Cup where they fell to the New Bedford Whalers 8–5 on aggregate. Ahrens scored a goal in the second game. He later moved to Hellrung & Grimm.

He was inducted into the St. Louis Soccer Hall of Fame in 1975.
