= Edward Hart (soccer) =

American soccer player (1903–1974)

Edward Hart (January 28, 1903 – August 5, 1974) was a former U.S. soccer forward who was a member of the U.S. soccer team at the 1924 Summer Olympics. He spent most of his professional career in the St. Louis Soccer League with one game in the American Soccer League.

== National team ==
Hart earned two caps with the U.S. national team in 1924. While Hart was a member of the U.S. team at the Olympics, he did not play in the two U.S. games. However, following the tournament, the U.S. had two exhibition games. Hart played in both, a win over Poland and a loss to Ireland.

== Professional ==
During the 1924-25 St. Louis Soccer League season, Hart played for St. Louis Scullin Steel F.C. and tied for fourth place on the goals list with eight. He played one game for the Providence Clamdiggers in the 1925-1926 American Soccer League season. He then returned to St. Louis where he played for Wellstone's in the St. Louis Soccer League. His six goals tied him for sixth place on the goals list. He remained with Wellstone's for the 1926–1927 season, this time topping the goals list with eleven. He played for Wellstone's through at least 1929. He is then listed with Hellrungs, remaining with them for the 1931–1932 season when the team as renamed Stix, Baer and Fuller F.C. That season, Hart and his teammates went to the final of the 1932 National Challenge Cup where they fell to the New Bedford Whalers. He was inducted into the St. Louis Soccer Hall of Fame in 1972.

He was born in St. Louis, Missouri.
