= Bob McAuley =

Scottish footballer and manager (1904–1994)

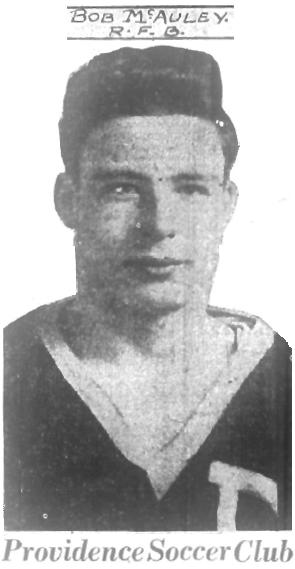

Personal information
- Birth name: Robert MacAulay
- Date of birth: 24 August 1904
- Place of birth: Wishaw, Scotland
- Date of death: 1994 (aged 89–90)
- Height: 5 ft 8 in (1.73 m)
- Position: Fullback

Senior career*
Years	Team	Apps	(Gls)
- Lachine
- Montréal Carsteel FC
- Grenadier Guards
1925–1928	Providence F.C.	92	(1)
1928–1930	Fall River	103	(6)
1930	Blue Bonnets		
1930–1932	Rangers	39	(0)
1932–1936	Chelsea	66	(1)
1936–1937	Cardiff City	4	(0)
1937–1938	Sligo Rovers		
1938–1939	Workington		
1939	Raith Rovers		

International career
1931	Scotland	2	(0)
1931	Scottish Football League XI	1	(0)

Managerial career
- 1937–1938: Sligo Rovers
- * Club domestic league appearances and goals

Robert McAuley (24 August 1904 – 1994) was a Scottish footballer who played as a fullback. He played professionally in Canada, England, Scotland, Ireland and the United States in addition to earning two caps in the Scotland national team in 1931.

== Professional ==
While born in Scotland, spending his infancy living in Wishaw, Lanarkshire, McAuley's family emigrated to Canada, and he grew up in Montreal, Quebec. At some point, he began playing for Lachine, then moved to Montréal Carsteel FC, showing on Montreal's roster on 3 August 1925 and again on 1 August 1927, both times as Montreal All-Stars lost the Carls-Rite Cup to Toronto All-Stars. He is also reported as having played for the Grenadier Guards.

In 1925, McAuley moved to the United States and signed with the Providence Clamdiggers of the American Soccer League. He played two and a half seasons in Providence before transferring to the Fall River halfway through the 1927–28 season. He remained with the 'Marksmen' until the spring of 1930. That year, Fall River defeated Cleveland Bruell Insurance in the 1930 National Challenge Cup. McAuley scored Fall River's second goal in the Marksmen's 2–1 second game victory.

In July 1930, McAuley signed with Rangers in the Scottish Football League. He made his debut on 13 September of that year, but then returned to Canada and played for Bluebonnets when they won the Quebec Cup at the end of that month. He came back to Rangers and played in two more matches at the end of that 1930–31 season (in which they won the Scottish title) and played regularly in the next, 48 matches including wins in the Glasgow Cup final and in the 1932 Scottish Cup Final, beating Kilmarnock after a replay.

In May 1932, he transferred to Chelsea in the English Football League. He spent over four years with the West London club before moving to Cardiff City in December 1936 for half a season. In 1937, he signed as a player-manager with Sligo Rovers of the League of Ireland. He then moved to Workington A.F.C. for the 1938–1939 season before finishing with Raith Rovers in 1939; he played three times for the Fife club at the start of the 1939–40 season but these were declared void after the outbreak of World War II.

== National team ==
McAuley earned two caps with the Scotland national team, a 3–1 victory over Ireland on 19 September 1931 and a 3–2 victory over Wales on 31 October 1931.
