= Willie McLean (soccer, born 1904) =

Scottish-American soccer player (1904-1977)

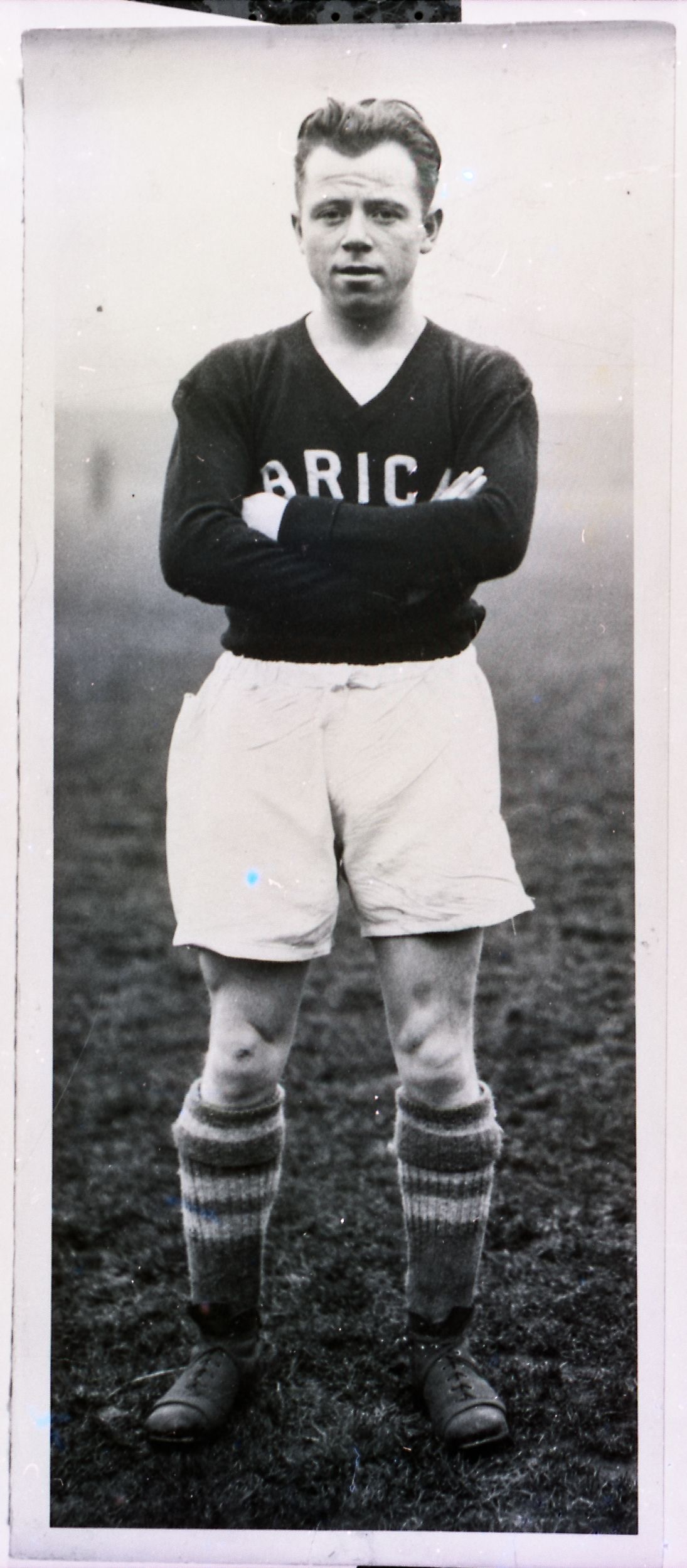
- Wee Willie McLean in 1928, playing for the Chicago Bricklayers.

Personal information
- Full name: William Lang McLean
- Date of birth: January 27, 1904
- Place of birth: Clydebank, Scotland
- Date of death: November 6, 1977 (aged 73)
- Place of death: Davenport, Iowa, U.S.
- Height: 5 ft 3 in (1.60 m)
- Position: Winger

Senior career*
Years	Team	Apps	(Gls)
- Pullman
- Chicago Canadians
–1932	Bricklayers and Masons		
1932–1934	Stix, Baer and Fuller		
1934–1935	→ St. Louis Central Breweries		
1935–1936	→ St. Louis Shamrocks		

International career
1934	United States	2	(0)
- * Club domestic league appearances and goals

William Stewart Lang (born William Lang McLean; January 27, 1904 – November 6, 1977) was a soccer player who played as a winger. A dominant player through the 1930s and a member of the U.S. national team at the 1934 FIFA World Cup, McLean disappeared without a trace in 1938. His disappearance remained a mystery until June 2022, when an investigation by The Athletic's Pablo Maurer and Matt Pentz uncovered the details behind that disappearance: McLean had suffered a nervous breakdown after multiple head injuries and lived out the last 40 years of his life in a series of public mental health facilities.

== Club career ==
=== Chicago ===
Born in Scotland, McLean immigrated to the United States when he was nineteen. He settled in Chicago where he joined Pullman which had dominated the Chicago Leagues and Peel Cup. At some point, he moved to the Canadians and finally to Bricklayers and Masons F.C. In 1928, the Bricklayers lost the National Challenge Cup to the New York Nationals. McLean and the Bricklayers lost a second Challenge Cup in 1931 when Fall River took them two games to one in the championship series.

=== St. Louis ===
In 1932, McLean moved to St. Louis where he signed with Stix, Baer and Fuller of the St. Louis Soccer League. The team went to the 1932 Challenge Cup final, but lost to the New Bedford Whalers. In 1933 and 1934, McLean would finally achieve success in the Challenge Cup when Stix, Baer and Fuller won two consecutive Challenge Cup titles, to go with two St. Louis Soccer League titles. Following their 1934 Challenge Cup victory, the team came under the sponsorship of Central Breweries. St. Louis Central Breweries continued the success they had experienced under the old name by winning a third Challenge Cup and league title in 1935, giving McLean three "doubles" in three years. The team went through another name change in 1935, this time to St. Louis Shamrocks. In 1936, McLean collapsed during a league game. In 1937, after spending nine months in a sanitarium, he moved back to Chicago.

== International career ==
In 1930, McLean attended two of the three trial games used to select the roster for the 1930 FIFA World Cup team. He was not selected. In 1934, McLean made the U.S. national team for the 1934 FIFA World Cup. McLean gained his first cap when the U.S. defeated Mexico, 4–2, in a World Cup qualifier. The U.S. then lost to Italy in the first round of the World Cup. While recovering from his 1936 collapse, McLean was called up to the national team for a three-game series with Mexico in 1937, but did not play.

== Disappearance ==
After returning to Chicago in 1937, McLean seemed to have kept a low profile. In the summer of 1938, he disappeared, leaving behind his wife Elizabeth and his young daughter. For years, it was assumed that McLean had died; in 1944, Aetna Life Insurance placed an ad in the Midwest Soccer News asking for information about his whereabouts. Despite that effort, McLean was never publicly seen again.

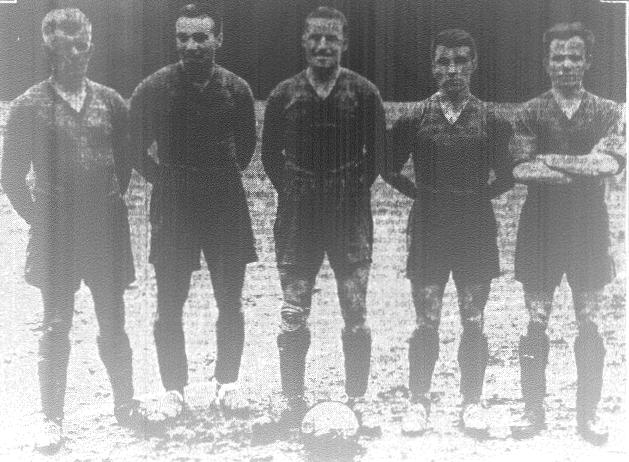
National Champion Stix forward line (April 1933)

In 2022, The Athletic's Pablo Maurer and Matt Pentz concluded a two-year-long investigation into McLean's mysterious disappearance. After his disappearance, McLean lived first in Chicago, and then moved to Davenport, Iowa in 1941. He changed his name to William Stewart Lang to avoid being found, working as a mechanic at a local garage. In 1946, McLean suffered another nervous breakdown and was institutionalized at the Mount Pleasant Mental Health Institute in Mount Pleasant, Iowa. He remained there for 13 years, undergoing electroconvulsive therapy and a transorbital lobotomy. In 1959, McLean was transferred to Pine Knoll Home in Davenport, a publicly-run assisted living facility, where he died on November 6, 1977. McLean is interred at Cedar Park Cemetery in Calumet Park, Illinois.

== Honors ==
Stix, Baer and Fuller F.C.

- National Challenge Cup: 1933, 1934

== See also ==
- List of solved missing person cases (pre-1950)
- List of United States men's international soccer players born outside the United States
