= 1937 National Challenge Cup =

- Dewar Challenge Cup

Tournament details
- Country: United States
- Dates: 10 January – 18 April 1937

Final positions
- Champions: New York Americans (1st title)
- Runners-up: St. Louis Shamrocks
- Semifinalists: Sparta Garden City; Brooklyn Hispano

The 1937 National Challenge Cup was the annual open cup held by the United States Football Association now known as the Lamar Hunt U.S. Open Cup.

== Eastern Division ==
First round
January 24 - Philadelphia
Philadelphia Germans | 5
Trenton Highlanders | 2
January 17 - Newark
Irish-Americans | 3
St. Michael's | 1
January 17 - New York
Brooklyn Hispano | 6
Hosiery Local | 0
January 24 - New York
Brookhattan | 5
Baltimore SC | 1
January 17/February 7 - New York
New York Americans | 4-6
German Hungarians | 0-2
January 24 - New York
St. Mary's Celtic | 5
Paterson Caledonian | 1
January 10 - Newark
Scots Americans | 4
Patapsco Rangers | 1
January 17 - Philadelphia
Philadelphia Passon | 4
Hatikvoh | 0

Quarter-finals
February 7,13
Philadelphia Germans | 1-0
Irish-Americans | 1-1
February 7 - New York
Brooklyn Hispano | 3
Brookhattan | 2
February 21 - New York
New York Americans | 2
St. Mary's Celtic | 1
February 7 - Newark
Scots Americans | 2
Philadelphia Passon | 1

Semi-finals
February 28 - Newark
Irish-Americans | 0
Brooklyn Hispano | 1
February 28 - New York
New York Americans | 2
Scots Americans | 1

Final
March 13,14 - New York
Brooklyn Hispano | 2-0
New York Americans | 0-3

== Western Division ==
First round
January 10 - Detroit
Detroit Chevrolets | 0
Shamrocks | 4
January 31 - Cleveland
Slavia Bartunek | 3
Graphite Bronze | 2
February 7 - St. Louis
Town Criers | 5
Club Lotus | 1
February 14 - St. Louis
Burkes | 1
North Side Optimists | 0
January 18 - Chicago
Sparta Garden City | 3
Milwaukee Vienna | 1
January 10 - Chicago
Olympia | 2
Maccabee | 1
January 10 - Bridgeville
Dunlevy | 0
Castle Shannon | 1
January 10 - Rochester
Kodak Park | 0
Heidelberg | 2

Quarter-finals
February 7 - St. Louis
Shamrocks | 1
Slavia Bartunek | 0
February 28 - St. Louis
Town Criers | 2
Burkes | 1
January 31 - Chicago
Sparta Garden City | 5
Olympia | 0
January 31 - Pittsburgh
Castle Shannon | 2
Heidelberg | 1

Semi-finals
March 7 - St. Louis
Shamrocks | 2
Town Criers | 1
February 21 - Chicago
Sparta Garden City | 6
Castle Shannon | 4

Final
March 21, April 4
Shamrocks | 3-0
Sparta Garden City | 1-0

== Final ==
=== First game ===
April 11, 1937

| St. Louis Shamrocks (MO) | 1–0 | New York Americans (NY) |
|---|---|---|
| Kane 44' |

Public Schools Stadium, St. Louis, Missouri
Attendance: 5,083
Referee: Tom Crompton

=== Second game ===
April 18, 1937

| New York Americans (NY) | 4–2 | St. Louis Shamrocks (MO) |
|---|---|---|
| Smith 2'; Kuntner; Michael 57'; Ferreira 70' | | Gonsalves; Strattman 47' |

Starlight Park, The Bronx, New York
Attendance: 6,000
Referee: James Walders

== Sources ==
- St. Louis Post-Dispatch
