= 1929–30 National Challenge Cup =

- Dewar Challenge Cup

Tournament details
- Country: United States
- Dates: 25 December 1929 – 6 April 1930

Final positions
- Champions: Fall River F.C. (3rd title)
- Runners-up: Cleveland Bruell
- Semifinalists: Holley Carburetor; Bethlehem Steel

The 1929–30 National Challenge Cup was the annual open cup held by the United States Football Association. It is now known as the Lamar Hunt U.S. Open Cup.

== Eastern Division ==
First round
February 2 - Tiverton
Fall River F.C.	5
Lusitania Recreation	0
January 26 - New Bedford
New Bedford Whalers	4
Bridgeport Hungaria	0
February 2 - Providence
Providence FC	1
Pawtucket Rangers	3
New York Nationals	w/o
Newark SC
February 2 - Brooklyn
Brooklyn Wanderers	6
Montclair Camerons	0
February 2 - New York
IRT Rangers	1
Hakoah All-Stars	3
February 2 - Bronx
New York Giants	6
Brooklyn Hispano	0
February 9 - Newark
Bethlehem Steel	8
Newark Portuguese	1

Second round
February 22 - Tiverton
Fall River F.C.	5
New Bedford Whalers	2
February 15 - Pawtucket
Pawtucket Rangers	3
New York Nationals	2
February 16 - Brooklyn
Brooklyn Wanderers	2
Hakoah All-Stars	1
February 23 - Bronx
New York Giants	1
Bethlehem Steel	2

Semi-finals
March 2 - Tiverton
Fall River F.C.	5
Pawtucket Rangers	2
March 2 - Brooklyn
Brooklyn Wanderers	0
Bethlehem Steel	2

Final
March 16, 23- New York/ New Bedford
Fall River F.C.	1-3
Bethlehem Steel	1-2

== Western Division ==
First round
December 29/Jan 5 - Chicago
Swedish-Americans	1-1
Bricklayers	1-2
December 29/Jan 5 - Chicago
Carpenters	2-2
Jugoslav American	2-2
February 2 - Detroit
Holley Carburetor	6
Pierpoints	1
February 9, 16 - Detroit
Detroit F.C.	3-1
All-Scots	3-0
January 5 - St. Louis
Ben Millers	2
Tablers	4
December 29 - St. Louis
Madison Kennel	1
Hellrungs	3
Dec 29/Jan 5, 12 - Cleveland
Bruell Insurance	8 ^{a}
Cleveland Slavia	7
December 25 - Chicago
Chicago Sparta	9
Olympia F.C.	3

Second round
February 23/Mar 2 - Chicago
Bricklayers	1-3
Carpenters	1-0
February 23 - Detroit
Holley Carburetor	3
Detroit F.C.	1
February 23 - St. Louis
Tablers	3
Hellrungs	2
February 16 - Cleveland
Bruell Insurance	2
Chicago Sparta	0

Semi-finals
March 9 - Chicago
Bricklayers	1
Holley Carburetor	2
March 3 - St. Louis
Tablers	1
Bruell Insurance	3

Final
March 16, 23
Holley Carburetor	1-0
Bruell Insurance	1-2

a) aggregate after 3 games

== Final ==
March 30, 1930

Fall River F.C. (MA)	7–2	Cleveland Bruell Insurance (OH)
McAuley 1', 4', 7'; McNab 20'; Nilsen 22', 30', 35'		Wilson 55', 88' (pen.)

Polo Grounds, New York, New York
Attendance: 10,000
Referee: Edward Donaghy, New York (USA)
April 6, 1930

Cleveland Bruell Insurance (OH)	1–2	Fall River F.C. (MA)
Phillips		McNab; McAuley

Luna Park, Cleveland, Ohio
Attendance: 3,500
Referee: Harry Pithie, Detroit (USA)

== Sources ==
- Jose, Colin (1998). American Soccer League, 1921-1931 (Hardback). The Scarecrow Press. (ISBN 0-8108-3429-4).
- 1930 U.S. Open Cup Results
