= 1933 National Challenge Cup =

- Dewar Challenge Cup

Tournament details
- Country: United States
- Dates: 14 January – 23 April 1933

Final positions
- Champions: Stix, Baer and Fuller (1st title)
- Runners-up: New York Americans
- Semifinalists: Sparta A & BA; Pawtucket Rangers

The 1933 National Challenge Cup was the 20th edition of the tournament currently known as the Lamar Hunt U.S. Open Cup, a knockout domestic cup competition of American soccer. The New Bedford Whalers did not defend their title, as the club had folded by the fall of 1932.

As of 1931, ASL teams competed in a round-robin format instead of direct knockout matches. The five New York teams formed the Metropolitan Group, while the New England group consisted of the three remaining ASL teams and Victoria Mills of the Southern New England Association, who qualified by defeating the Fairlawn Rovers. The round-robin format was considered somewhat unpopular due to the methods used.

Despite the league-style setup, matches tied at the end of regulation proceeded into overtime. In the event of a tie in the standings, goal average was used as the tiebreaker. A minor controversy occurred when a match between the Boston team and Fall River was stopped in the 78th minute with the score at 0–0. Fall River later forfeited the replay, leaving Boston tied for first place with the Pawtucket Rangers. The Rangers advanced due to a higher goal average, which left Boston unable to make up the difference either in a replay with Fall River or in a playoff with Pawtucket.

In the Western division, the tournament followed the traditional knockout format, with the Stix of St. Louis making the second of their six consecutive appearances in the national final. Other highlights included Bert Patenaude's five-goal performance against Fairhill in the First German Club's first-round match on January 14.

== Eastern Division ==
First round
February 5 - Brooklyn
German Hungarians	w/o
Brooklyn Celtic
January 15 - Newark
Swanton F.C.	3
Trenton Highlanders	1
January 7 - February 19
Pawtucket Rangers	1st
Boston SC	2nd
Fall River FC	3rd
Victoria Mills	4th
January 14, 21 - Philadelphia
German Americans	6-2
Fairhill	5-1
January 15 - Baltimore
Baltimore Canton	4
Bethlehem Steel	1
January 8 - February 22
New York Americans	1st
New York Field Club	2nd
Hakoah All-Stars	3rd
Brooklyn Wanderers	4th

Second round
February 26/March 5 - New York
German Hungarians	1-4
Swanton F.C.	1-0
Pawtucket Rangers
Won Round Robin
February 25 - Philadelphia
German Americans	3
Baltimore Canton	2
New York Americans
Won Round Robin

Semi-finals
March 27 - New York
German Hungarians	0
Pawtucket Rangers	5
March 11, 12
German Americans	0-2
New York Americans	1-3

Final
April 1, 2
Pawtucket Rangers	4-1
New York Americans	2-4

== Western Division ==
First round
January 22 - St. Louis
Stix	4
Coca-Colas	1
January 22 - Milwaukee
Deutscher Sport Club	0
Jugo-Slavs	1
January 15 - St. Louis
Andersons	3
Ben Millers	2
January 22,29/February 5 - Detroit
Maccabee All-Stars	4^{a}
Sons of Malta	6
January 22 - Chicago
Chicago Sparta	2
Norwegian Americans	1
February 5 - Chicago
Chicago Bricklayers	1
Swedish Americans	2
January 22 - Pittsburgh
Pittsburgh Curry	4
Cleveland Shamrocks	0
January 22 - Cleveland
Cleveland Slavia	4
Buffalo German	1

Second round
February 12 - St. Louis
Stix	10
Jugo-Slavs	1
February 19 - St. Louis
Andersons	7
Sons of Malta	1
February 19 - Chicago
Chicago Sparta	2
Swedish Americans	0
February 19 - Pittsburgh
Pittsburgh Curry	1
Cleveland Slavia	3

Semi-finals
February 26/March 12 - St. Louis
Stix	1-4^{b}
Andersons	2-1
February 26 - Chicago
Chicago Sparta	1
Cleveland Slavia	0

Final
March 19, 26
Stix	7-1
Chicago Sparta	3-0

a) aggregate after 3 games
b) replayed after protest

Round Robin Groups

Metropolitan		Pts	GP	W	L	GF	GA	Dif	Perc
1	New York Americans	12	4	4	0	14	5	+9	1.000
2	New York Field Club	6	4	3	1	9	3	+6	.750
3	Hakoah All-Stars	4	4	2	2	9	5	+4	.500
4	Brooklyn Wanderers	0	3	0	3	3	10	-7	.000
5	Bohemian Queens	0	3	0	3	3	15	-12	.000

New England		Pts	GP	W	L	GF	GA	Dif	Perc
1	Pawtucket Rangers	8	6	4	2	26	13	+13	.666
2	Boston SC	8	6	4	2	10	11	-1	.666
3	Fall River FC	4	6	2	4	9	12	-3	.333
4	Victoria Mills	4	6	2	4	11	20	-9	.333

== Final ==
=== First game ===
April 16, 1933

Stix, Baer and Fuller F.C. (MO)	1–0	New York Americans (NY)
McLean 47'

Sportsman's Park, St. Louis, Missouri
Attendance: 15,200
Referee: Dave Evans

=== Second game ===
April 23, 1933

New York Americans (NY)	1–2	Stix, Baer and Fuller F.C. (MO)
Michaels		McLean 15'; Nilsen 83'

Starlight Park, The Bronx, New York
Attendance: 4,200
Referee: Patrick Howley

== Sources ==
- St. Louis Post-Dispatch
