= William Lehman (soccer) =

American soccer player

Personal information
- Full name: William Lehman
- Date of birth: December 20, 1901
- Place of birth: St. Louis, Missouri, United States
- Date of death: January 1979
- Place of death: St. Louis, Missouri, United States
- Position: Half back

Senior career*
Years	Team	Apps	(Gls)
1928–1929	Wellstones		
1929–1931	Hellrungs		
1931–1935	→ Stix, Baer and Fuller F.C.		
1935–1936	→ St. Louis Central Breweries F.C.		
1936–1938	→ St. Louis Shamrocks		

International career
1934	United States	1	(0)
- * Club domestic league appearances and goals

William Lehman (December 20, 1901 – January 1979) was an American soccer half back who was on the U.S. roster at the 1934 FIFA World Cup. He played professionally in the St. Louis Soccer League.

== Professional career ==
Lehman played for Wellstones during the 1928-1929 St. Louis Soccer League season. In 1929, he moved to the newly established Hellrungs. In 1931, the team passed under new corporate sponsorship and became known as Stix, Baer and Fuller F.C. In 1934, Lehman and his teammates won their second consecutive National Challenge Cup title. That year, St. Louis Central Brewery became the team sponsor for a single season. Breweries went on to win the 1935 National Cup. Following the Cup win, the team became the St. Louis Shamrocks and left the SLSL. Lehman remained with the team until it folded in 1938.

== National team ==
Following their 1934 National Cup victory, several of the SBF players, including Lehman, were selected for the U.S. national team at the World Cup. Lehman earned his one cap with the U.S. national team in its qualification victory over Mexico just prior to the cup.
