= 1935 National Challenge Cup =

- Dewar Challenge Cup

Tournament details
- Country: United States
- Dates: 13 January – 12 May 1935

Final positions
- Champions: St. Louis Central Breweries (3rd title)
- Runners-up: Pawtucket Rangers
- Semifinalists: Wieboldt Wonderbolts; Scots Americans

The 1935 National Challenge Cup was the annual open cup held by the United States Football Association now known as the Lamar Hunt U.S. Open Cup.

== Eastern Division ==
First round
March 2, 3
Pawtucket Rangers	4-2
Thornton Victorias	2-2
January 19, 27 - Pawtucket
Pawtucket Celtics	2-3
American Steel & Wire	1-2
February 3, 24
Fall River Liberals	3-0
Boston	2-2
Portuguese SC
March 2- Newark
Scots Americans	1-2
Irish Americans	1-0
March 3- Philadelphia
Baltimore Canton	1
German Americans	0
February 17 - New York
New York Americans	8
Brooklyn Hispano	2
February 24 - New York
Brooklyn Celtics	2
Brookhattan	1

Quarter-finals
March 9, 16 - Pawtucket
Pawtucket Rangers	5-2
Pawtucket Celtics	2-1
March 10, 17
Fall River Liberals	4-2
Portuguese SC	2-3
March 10 - Newark
Scots Americans	4
Baltimore Canton	3
March 3 - New York
New York Americans	5
Brooklyn Celtics	1

Semi-finals
March 23, 24
Pawtucket Rangers	1-2
Fall River	0-1
March 16,17
Scots Americans	2-0
New York Americans	0-0

Final
March 30,31
Pawtucket Rangers	3-2
Scots Americans	3-0

== Western Division ==
First round
January 20 - St. Louis
Central Breweries	9
Ben Millers	1
February 3 - Cleveland
Cleveland Slavia	3
Banat German Sports	1
February 3 - Chicago
Sparta Leaders	6
Hungarian American S.C.	0
February 3 - Milwaukee
Milwaukee Vienna	5
Lawndale Rangers	0
February 3 - Detroit
Detroit Flandria	2
Wieboldt Wonderbolts	3
February 17 - Chicago
Maccabee	2
Norwegian Americans	0
February 3 - Pittsburgh
Curry Silver Tops	4
Rochester Celtic	1
January 13 - St. Louis
Marres	2
Hellrung & Grimm	1

Quarter-finals
February 24 - St. Louis
Central Breweries	1
Cleveland Slavia	0
February 17 - Chicago
Sparta Leaders	3
Milwaukee Vienna	4
February 24 - Chicago
Wieboldt Wonderbolts	4
Maccabee	0
March 3 - Pittsburgh
Curry Silver Tops	2
Marres	0

Semi-finals
March 3 - St. Louis
Central Breweries	5
Milwaukee Vienna	0
March 17 - Pittsburgh
Curry Silver Tops	0
Wieboldt Wonderbolts	1

Final
March 24,31/April 6,14,21
Central Breweries	9^{a}
Wieboldt Wonderbolts	8

a)aggregate after 5 games, Central advances on 2 wins to Wieboldt's 1

== Final ==
=== First game ===
April 28, 1935

St. Louis Central Breweries F.C. (MO)	5–2	Pawtucket Rangers (RI)
Patenaude 28', 75'; Gonsalves 72', 78'; McNab 88' (pen.)		McAuley 65'; Raposa 68'

Walsh Memorial Stadium, St. Louis, Missouri
Attendance: 4,500
Referee: James McFarlane

=== Second game ===
May 5, 1935

Pawtucket Rangers (RI)	1–1	St. Louis Central Breweries F.C. (MO)
Dick 49'		Gonsalves 70'

Coats Field, Pawtucket, Rhode Island
Attendance: 4,000
Referee: Andrew Tehel

=== Third game ===
May 12, 1935

Pawtucket Rangers (RI)	3–1	St. Louis Central Breweries F.C. (MO)
McIntyre 52'; Dick 54' (McAuley), 80' (McPherson)		McLean 20' (Patenaude)

Newark School Stadium, Newark, New Jersey
Attendance: 3,000
Referee: Andrew Tehel
- The St. Louis Central Breweries F.C. took the championship 7–6 on aggregate.

== Sources ==
- St. Louis Post-Dispatch
