= 1934 National Challenge Cup =

- Dewar Challenge Cup

Tournament details
- Country: United States
- Dates: 7 January – 16 April 1934

Final positions
- Champions: Stix, Baer and Fuller (2nd title)
- Runners-up: Pawtucket Rangers
- Semifinalists: Wieboldt Wonderbolts; Brooklyn Hispano

The 1934 National Challenge Cup was the annual open cup held by the United States Football Association now known as the Lamar Hunt U.S. Open Cup.

== Eastern Division ==
First round
January 14 - East Newark
Irish-Americans	1
Newark First Germans	3
January 14 - Starlight Park
New York Americans	4
Brookhattan	2
January 14 - Glen Cove, New York
Glen Cove F.C.	1
Hispano	2
January 14
Brooklyn Celtic
bye

Second round
January 21
Boston	2
New Bedford Defenders	1
January 21, 28 - Fall River
Fall River Rovers	4-1
Fall River Uniteds	2-1
January 20, 28 - Pawtucket
Pawtucket Rangers	4-2
Thornton Victorias	2-3
February 17, 25
Fairlawn Rovers	3-3
New Bedford Tessiers	1-1
January 28 - Union
Newark First Germans	2
Baltimore Canton	1
January 28 - Newark
Scots Americans	3
Ryersons	1
January 28 - Bronx
New York Americans	2
Brooklyn First German	0
January 28 - Brooklyn
Brooklyn Hispano	3
Brooklyn Celtic	1

Third round
February 18, 25
Boston	4-1
Fall River Rovers	1-0
March 3, 4 - Pawtucket
Pawtucket Rangers	4-4
Fairlawn Rovers	3-1
February 11, 25 - Newark
Newark Germans	1-3
Scots Americans	1-0
March 4 - Bronx
New York Americans	0
Brooklyn Hispano	1

Semi-finals
March 10, 18
Pawtucket Rangers	3-5
Boston Celtics	1-1
March 10, 17, 18
Newark Germans	5 ^{a}
Brooklyn Hispano	6

Final
March 24, 25
Pawtucket Rangers	6-4
Brooklyn Hispano	0-2

== Western Division ==
First round
January 14 - St. Louis
Stix	6
Minit Rubs	1
Detroit
Sons of Malta	2
Swedish-Americans	0
January 14, 22 - Pittsburgh
Curry Silver Tops	1-2
Morgan	1-1
January 21 - Cleveland
Bartunek Slavia	2
Milwaukee Vienna	1
January 14 - Chicago
Sparta Leaders	8
Norwegian Americans	2
January 14 - St. Louis
Cleveland Indians	2
Cleveland Shamrocks	0
December 17/January 7 - St. Louis
Ben Millers	4-6
Andersons	4-2
January 14 - Chicago
Wieboldt Wonderbolts	5
Swedish American	1

Second round
February 4 - St. Louis
Stix	3
Sons of Malta	0
February 4, 11 - Pittsburgh
Curry	0-2
Slavia	0-0
February 4 - Chicago
Sparta	6
Cleveland Indians	0
February 4 - St. Louis
Ben Miller	1
Wieboldt Wonderbolts	3

Semi-finals
February 18 - St. Louis
Stix	4
Curry	0
February 25/March 4 - Chicago
Sparta	0-1
Wieboldt Wonderbolts	0-2

Final
March 11, 18, 25
Stix	7 ^{b}
Wieboldt Wonderbolts	3

a,b) aggregate after 3 games

== Final ==
=== First game ===
April 1, 1934

Stix, Baer and Fuller F.C. (MO)	4–2 (a.e.t.)	Pawtucket Rangers (RI)
McNab 4'; Gonsalves 91'; Nilsen 110'; Flavin 116'		McAuley 15' (pen.); McIntyre 104'

Walsh Memorial Stadium, St. Louis, Missouri
Attendance: 7,122
Referee: Ed Donaghy

=== Second game ===
April 8, 1934

Pawtucket Rangers (RI)	3–2	Stix, Baer and Fuller F.C. (MO)
McIntyre; McAuley 83'		Nilsen 27'; Gonsalves

Coats Field, Pawtucket, Rhode Island
Attendance: 4,500
Referee: William Murray

=== Third game ===
April 16, 1934

Stix, Baer and Fuller F.C. (MO)	5–0	Pawtucket Rangers (RI)
Gonsalves 41', 57'; Nilsen 70', 81'; McLean 80'

Walsh Memorial Stadium, St. Louis, Missouri
Attendance: 7,657
Referee: Tom Crompton

== Sources ==
- St. Louis Post-Dispatch
