= Jimmy Dunn (soccer) =

American soccer player (1897–1987)

Personal information
- Full name: James Dunn
- Date of birth: August 21, 1897
- Place of birth: St. Louis, Missouri, United States
- Date of death: March 6, 1987 (aged 89)
- Place of death: St. Louis, Missouri, United States
- Height: 5 ft 10 in (1.78 m)
- Position: Forward

Youth career
- 1914–1915: Christian Brothers College
- 1915–1916: Missouri A.C.

Senior career*
Years	Team	Apps	(Gls)
1916–1917	Ben Millers		
1919–1927	Ben Millers		
- * Club domestic league appearances and goals

James Dunn (August 21, 1897 – March 6, 1987) was an American soccer forward who spent nine seasons with Ben Millers in the St. Louis Soccer League and was inducted into the National Soccer Hall of Fame in 1974.

== Biography ==
Dunn began his career with Christian Brothers College (CBC) of the St. Louis Municipal League, the city's de facto second division. CBC won the league title, but Dunn moved to the Missouri Athletic Club for the 1915–1916 season. Dunn won a second Municipal League title that season before turning professional with the Ben Millers of the St. Louis Soccer League. Dunn played the 1916–1917 season with Ben Millers, winning another league title. At the end of the season, Dunn enlisted in the U.S. Navy for two years. When he returned to St. Louis in 1919, he re-signed with Ben Millers becoming the team's starting center forward. Ben Millers won the 1919-1920 league title. In May 1920, Ben Millers won the National Challenge Cup over Fore River of the Southern New England Soccer League. Dunn, captain for the game, scored the winning goal, twelve minutes into the second half for the 2–1 win. Ben Millers did not win another league title until the 1924–1925 season. However, that championship put them into the one-time American Professional Soccer Championship. In 1925, the St. Louis Soccer League and American Soccer League boycotted the National Challenge Cup. In its place, they competed in what they called the American Professional Soccer Championship which pitted the champions of the two leagues. The Ben Millers faced the Boston Soccer Club for a two-game series. The first, played in St. Louis, went to Ben Millers, with Dunn scoring the game's lone goal. On the return game in Boston, the 'Wonder Workers' won 3–1, with Dunn again scoring. The final, and deciding, game took place two weeks later in St. Louis. The 'Wonder Workers' won the game and the title with a 3–2 victory. Dunn again scored in the loss. Ben Millers repeated as league champion in each of the next two seasons and finished runner-up to Bethlehem Steel in the 1926 National Challenge Cup. Over his nine seasons with Ben Miller, Dunn scored fifty-three goals.

== Honors ==
Dunn was inducted into the St. Louis Soccer Hall of Fame in 1971 and the National Soccer Hall of Fame in 1974.
