= St. Teresa F.C. =

American soccer team

The St. Teresa Football Club was an American soccer team based in St. Louis, Missouri founded in 1907. They competed in the St. Louis Soccer League..

In 1907, Lawrence Riley, a member of St. Teresa of Avila Catholic Church in St. Louis, Missouri, convinced members of the St. Teresa Young Men's Sodality to form a soccer team. They entered the newly established St. Louis Soccer League, finishing third during the 1907-08 season. They finished runner-up the next two seasons, but were dropped from the league in 1910. On January 2, 1910, St. Teresa defeated the Nationals from Cincinnati for the Midwest Championship. They played in the Robison Field League from 1913 to 1915. In 1915, they moved down to the Fairground Division of the Municipal League.
