= Bill Fiedler =

American soccer player

Personal information
- Full name: William John Fiedler
- Date of birth: January 10, 1910
- Place of birth: Philadelphia, Pennsylvania, United States
- Date of death: September 30, 1985 (aged 75)
- Place of death: Brick, New Jersey, United States
- Position: Midfielder

Senior career*
Years	Team	Apps	(Gls)
1933–	Philadelphia German-Americans		
–1940	Philadelphia Passon		

International career
1936	United States	1	(0)
- * Club domestic league appearances and goals

William John Fiedler (January 10, 1910 - September 30, 1985) was an American soccer midfielder who played seven seasons in the American Soccer League. He was on the U.S. national soccer team at both the 1934 FIFA World Cup and 1936 Summer Olympics. He was born in Philadelphia, Pennsylvania.

== Professional career ==
Fiedler began his professional career in 1933 with the Philadelphia German-Americans in the American Soccer League, winning the 1935 league championship and the 1936 National Challenge Cup title. In the National Cup series, Fiedler scored one of the Philadelphia goals in its 2–2 away tie with the St. Louis Shamrocks. At some point, he moved to Philadelphia Passon. He left the ASL in 1940.

== National and Olympic team ==
Fiedler was called into the for the 1934 FIFA World Cup, but did not see time in the lone U.S. game of the cup, a 7–1 loss to eventual champion Italy. He later played with the national team in an unofficial game with Scotland on June 9, 1935. A year later, Fiedler was part of the U.S. team at the 1936 Summer Olympics. The U.S. lost its only game of the tournament 1–0 to Italy. In that game, “Fiedler suffered torn ligaments in his knee when pushed roughly by Piccini, of the rival team. Weingartner (the referee) "put the thumb" on the Italian, ordering him from the game. Three times he tried to get Piccini to leave but finally gave up. A half dozen Italian players swarmed over the referee, pinning his hands to his sides and clamping hands over his mouth. The game was formally finished with Piccini still in the line up."

Fiedler died in September 1985 at the age of 75.
