= St. Matthew's (soccer team) =

St. Matthew's was a U.S. soccer team which played the 1937–38 season in the St. Louis Soccer League, winning the league title.

== History ==
In 1937, the St. Louis Soccer League was quickly declining. Of the four teams from the previous season, three had left the league. As a result, St. Matthew's, St. Patrick's and South Side Radio joined Burke's Undertakers, the 1936–1937 champion, for the upcoming season. According to Bob Corbett, an SLSL player with St. Patrick's and Burke's, "There seemed to be little interest in the season, only in the cup play." St. Matthew's won the league title, but fell to Burke's in the league cup. At the end of the season, three of the top four scorers came from St. Matthew's.

== Record ==
Year	Record	League	Open Cup
1937–38	6–0–4	Champion	First round
