= Hellrung & Grimm =

Hellrung & Grimm was a U.S. soccer team in St. Louis, Missouri which was sponsored by the Hellrung & Grimm Furniture Company. It spent the 1935-1936 season in the St. Louis Soccer League.

== History ==
Hellrung & Grimm was a St. Louis based furniture store run by the Hellrung and Grimm families. The company sponsored several athletic teams including soccer teams. In 1929, a team, known as Hellrungs, sponsored by the company, entered the city's first division league, the St. Louis Soccer League, playing under that name until 1931. That year the team passed sponsorship of the team to the Stix, Baer and Fuller Department Store. At some point, Hellrungs & Grimm took on sponsorship of another soccer team. This team, known as Hellrung & Grimm spent the 1934-1935 season in the St. Louis Municipal League, the city's second division. The team went to the 1935 National Challenge Cup first round where it lost to Marre's. In the fall of 1935, guided by manager Phil Kavanaugh, Hellrung & Grimm moved up to the first division. The team withdrew from the league at the end of the season. However, they went to the first round of the 1936 National Challenge Cup where they fell to St. Louis Shamrocks. The Hellrungs baseball team participated in the University City Municipal League winning four straight championships from 1933 to 1936.
