= Cleveland Bruell Insurance =

20th century US soccer team

Cleveland Bruell Insurance, also known as Bruell F.C., Cleveland Bruells, Bruell American Hungarians and the Cleveland Bruell Hungarian-Americans was an early twentieth century U.S. soccer team from Cleveland, Ohio

== History ==
In 1929, Bruell Insurance joined the newly established Midwest Professional Soccer League. The league lasted only one season but Bruell won the league cup, known as the Triner Cup. Bruell's greatest success came in the 1930 National Challenge Cup when it lost to the Fall River F.C. in the final.

== Honors ==
National Challenge Cup

- Runner Up (1): 1930

Triner Cup

- Winner (1): 1929
