= St. Louis Vesper Buick =

Vesper Buick was a U.S. soccer team established in 1922 in St. Louis, Missouri. The team played in the St. Louis Soccer League, winning two league titles and losing the 1924 National Challenge Cup. The team changed sponsorship in 1926, becoming White Banner.

== History ==
Vesper Buick was sponsored by the Vesper Buick company for its four seasons. When it entered the St. Louis Soccer League in 1922, it quickly rose to dominance, winning the league title. It repeated as champion the next season, before finishing second the next two seasons. On March 30, 1924, Vesper Buick fell to the Fall River F.C. of the American Soccer League in the National Challenge Cup. The game, won 4–2 by the 'Marksmen', was played in St. Louis at the High School Field.

== Record ==
Year	Record	League	National Cup
1922–1923	8-4-5	Champion	First Round
1923–1924	9-2-2	Champion	Final
1924–1925	10-4-4	2nd	Did not enter
1925–1926	7-4-3	2nd	Final
