= Stix Baer & Fuller =

Stix, Baer, and Fuller
- Type: Company and then division
- Industry: Retail
- Founded: 1892
- Defunct: 1984
- Fate: Unable to compete with The May Company's Famous-Barr, was later sold to Dillard's
- Successor: Dillard's
- Headquarters: St. Louis, Missouri, USA
- Owner: Associated Dry Goods

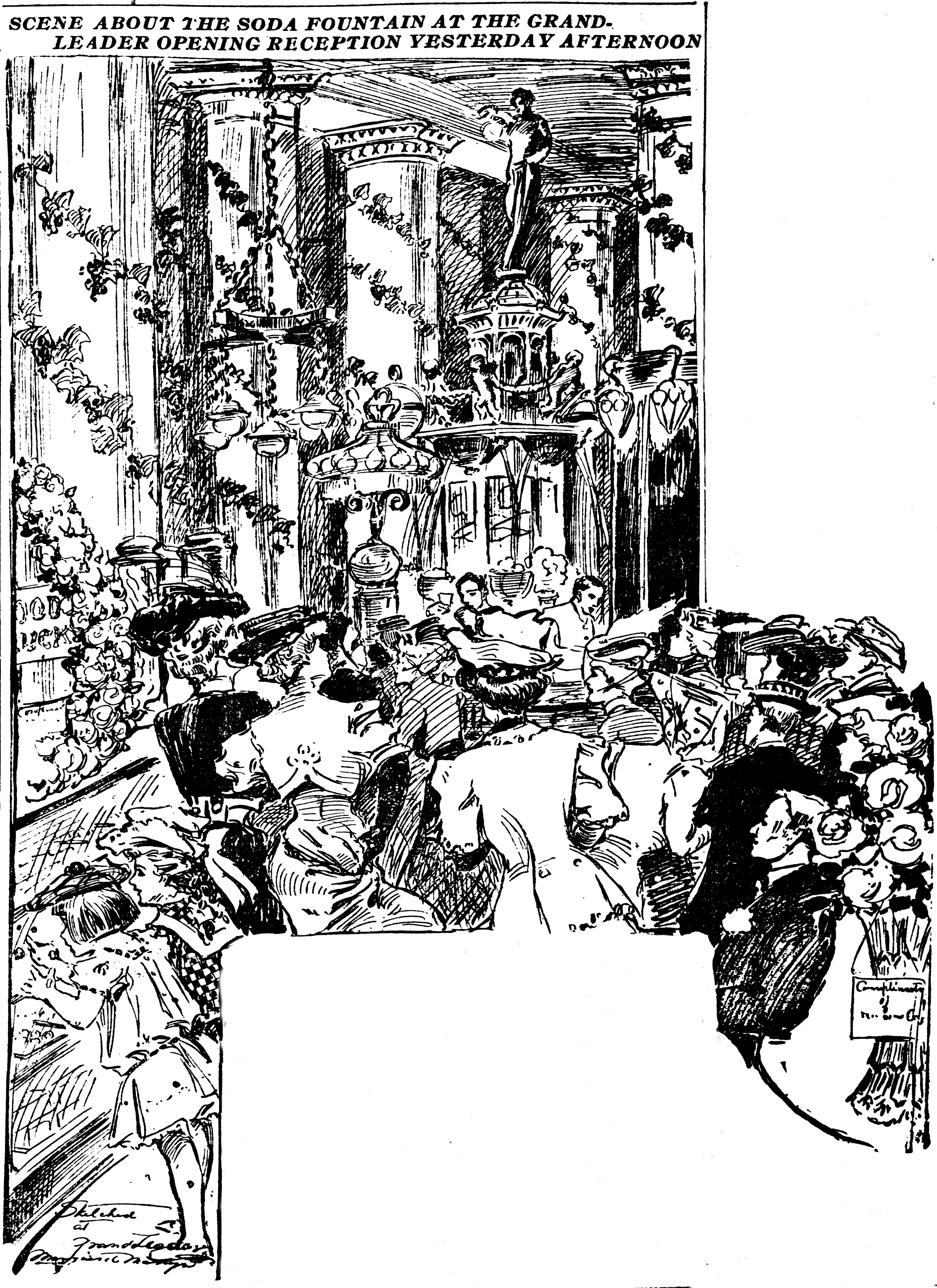
Sketch by St. Louis Post-Dispatch journalist Marguerite Martyn of the opening of the Grand-Leader department store on September 8, 1906

Stix, Baer and Fuller (sometimes called "Stix" or SBF or the Grand-Leader) was a department store chain in St. Louis, Missouri that operated from 1892 to 1984.

== Founders and history ==
Originally called the Grand-Leader, the original central downtown store was located on the north side of Washington Avenue between Sixth and Seventh street and by 1920 had grown to encompass the entire city block.

The store was founded in 1892 by Charles Stix, brothers Julius Baer and Sigmond Baer, and Aaron Fuller. It was a public company, with its publicly listed shares traded on the New York Stock Exchange. The company was a longtime member of the American Merchandising Companies ("AMC"), a trade association of important, locally owned department stores across the United States. For many years the company was known as the leading high-end fashion store in the St. Louis Metropolitan Area, although a smaller competitor, Scruggs, Vandervoort and Barney, also vied for that position.

In 1937 Arthur B. Baer (1895–1970), the only son of Julius Baer (1861–1940), became president. At one point, Stix's largest shareholders were Arthur B. Baer, Sidney Baer and Leo C. Fuller, who were also the senior officers of the company. However, they hired a series of more experienced retailers to run the business as general managers. Those with the longest tenure were first, Morris Jelenko and later, Frank P. Wolff. The last general manager and president was J. Arthur Baer, son of Arthur B. Baer.

In 1966 the company was purchased by Associated Dry Goods (ADG) and eventually expanded into the Kansas City market.

Unable to compete against Famous-Barr, ADG sold the 13-store division in 1984 to Dillard's, which also re-branded the stores to the Dillard's name. The flagship store in downtown St. Louis, designed by John Mauran and built in stages between 1906 and 1991, was briefly closed and reopened in 1985 as part of the St. Louis Centre Mall, but would be shuttered in September 2001, amidst the mall's failure. The River Roads store was demolished along with the rest of shopping center. The store at the former Crestwood Plaza was demolished in Fall, 2016. (The remainder of the former Crestwood Plaza will also be demolished Winter 2016, and into 2017 for a new development.)

- Grand–Leader (Stix, Baer & Fuller Dry Goods Co.) Building
- U.S. National Register of Historic Places
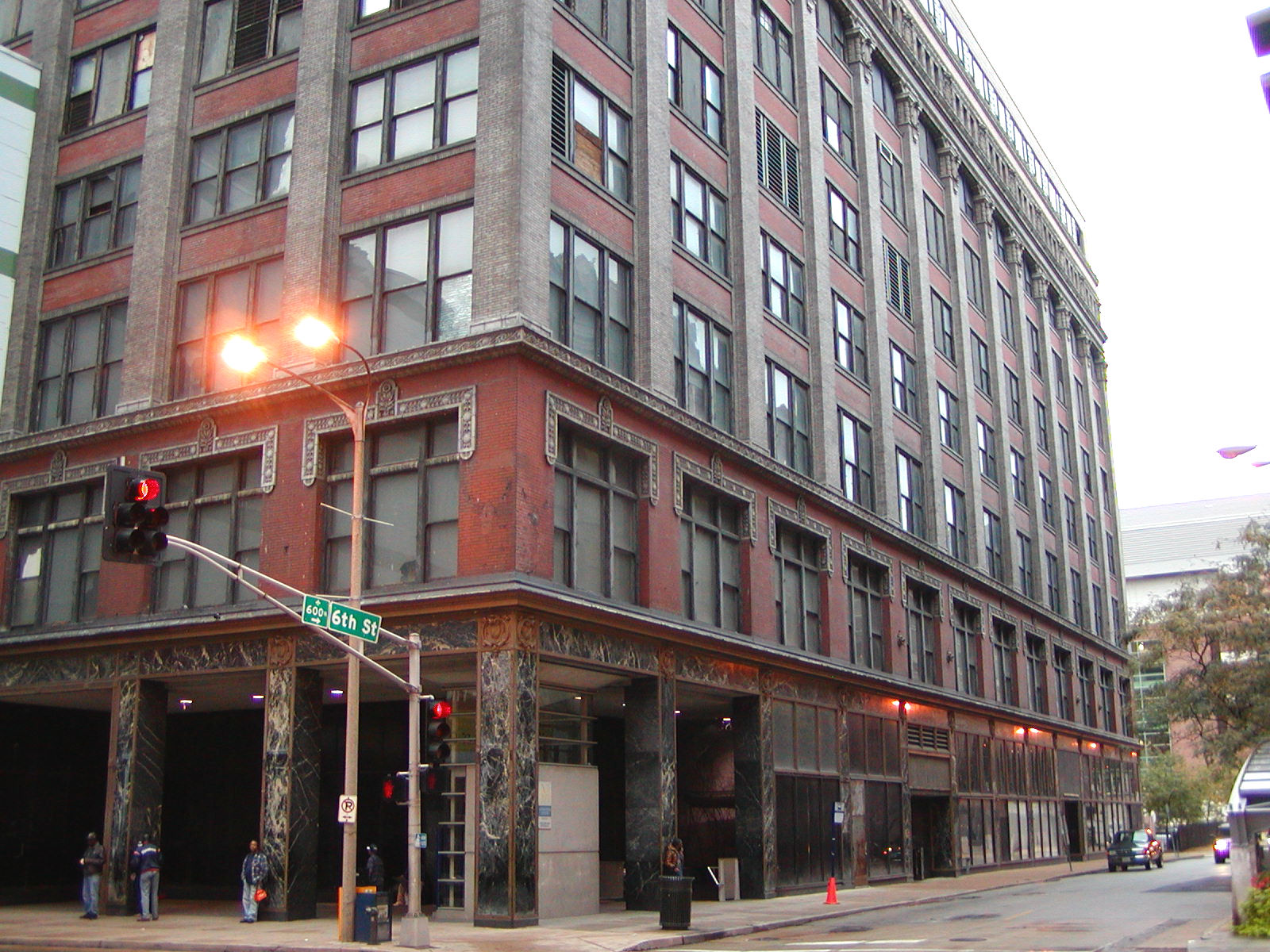

- Location within St. Louis Location within Missouri Location within the United States
- Location: 601 Washington Ave., St. Louis, Missouri
- Coordinates: 38°37′57″N 90°11′23″W
- Architects: Mauran, Russell & Crowell
- Architectural style: Early Commercial
- NRHP reference No.: 03000650
- Added to NRHP: July 17, 2003

== Athletic sponsorship ==
In the early 1930s, the company sponsored a local St. Louis Soccer League team, known as Stix, Baer and Fuller F.C. This team won the 1933 and 1934 National Challenge Cup national soccer titles.

== Radio station ==
On April 3, 1922, the firm started a radio station with the call sign WCK. In June 1925 the call letters were changed to WSBF in accordance with the company's initials. The station was sold to the Mississippi Valley Broadcasting Co. in 1927.

== Television station ==
In 1955 Arthur Baer donated funds toward the construction of the first building that housed Channel 9, the first television studio in the nation built expressly for educational television. The Julius and Freda Baer Building was named in memory of his parents and was located on the edge of Washington University in St. Louis campus at 6996 Millbrook Boulevard (now renamed Forest Park Parkway), at the southeast corner of Millbrook and Big Bend boulevards. A Washington University dormitory now takes up the entire block. The station building was just to the right of the main entrance to the dormitory.

== Community relations ==
The S bar F Scout Ranch in Knob Lick, Missouri, is named for Stix, Baer, and Fuller due to their contribution to help buy the property.

In September 1942 Stix, Baer and Fuller donated $10,000 (~$155,585 in 2025) to save the old Campbell House in downtown St. Louis from demolition. The donation was made in recognition of the company's 50th anniversary. Shortly thereafter the Campbell House Museum with original furnishings opened to the public. The St. Louis Globe-Democrat noted at the time, "A show window replica of the Campbell parlor, furnished with objects from the home, will be displayed by the department store tomorrow at Seventh street and Washington avenue. Figures in the window will be dressed in the costumes of the period, including some of the dresses worn by Mrs. Robert Campbell when she was the reigning hostess of the city."
