= Trenton Highlanders =

The Trenton Highlanders were an American soccer club based in Trenton, New Jersey that was a member of the professional American Soccer League. The Highlanders had been previously an amateur club.

In 1931, the Highlanders lost 7-1 to Baltimore in the first round of the National Amateur Cup. In 1932, they defeated Philadelphia’s Fairhill club 4-0 in the first round but lost 2-0 to the Newark Americans. The Highlanders were defeated in the first round in 1933.

In 1937, the Highlanders won the eastern National Amateur Cup, defeating the Brooklyn Germans 2-1 after two periods of extra time. They won the National Amateur Cup final by defeated Pittsburgh Castle Shannon 1-0. They were then selected by the United States Soccer Football Federation to represent the United States in the 'Pan American Olympics' organised in Dallas. The Highlanders were defeated 9-1 by Argentina led by Ángel Laferrara (who scored 5 goals) in the opening match. The Highlanders then lost 3-2 to Canada (represented by the Irish Soccer Club from Winnipeg).

Before the 1938/39 ASL season, the club was absorbed by Paterson Caledonian who moved to Trenton and took the amateur club's name. The Highlanders finished the fifth in the 1938–39 American Soccer League season. They were defeated 8-2 by the New York Americans. After a single season in Trenton, the team returned to Paterson as Paterson F.C.

== Year-by-year ==
Year	Division	League	Reg. season	Playoffs	U.S. Open Cup
1938/39	N/A	ASL	5th, National	Did not qualify	Second round
