= Burke's Undertakers =

American soccer team

Burke’s Undertakers was an American soccer team which competed in St. Louis, Missouri. Originally established as the Spanish Sports Club, it played in the St. Louis Municipal League for several years under the name of Spanish Sports Club. In 1935, the team moved up to the St. Louis Soccer League and was renamed Burke's. It spent four seasons in the St. Louis Soccer League, winning two league titles before the league collapsed in 1939.

== History ==
Prior to the 1935 season Burke's was called Spanish Sports Club and played in the St. Louis Municipal League. In 1935, the team moved to the professional St. Louis Soccer League. A month and a half into the season the club picked up the sponsorship of Burke's Funeral Home. They won the league title both that first season and the next year before collapsing to the bottom of the standings the next two season. In 1939, the SLSL collapsed.

== Record ==
Year	Record	League	Open Cup
1935–36	8–0–0	Champion	1st Round
1936–37	6–2–1	Champion	
1937–38	0–3–7	4th	
1938–39	0–4–1	4th	
