= Ben Millers =

U.S. soccer club

- Founded: 1913
- Dissolved: 1935; 91 years ago
- Ground: St. Louis, Missouri
- Owner: Peter Ratican
- League: St. Louis Soccer League
- 1935: 4th.

Ben Millers was a U.S. soccer club sponsored by the Ben W. Miller Hat Company of St. Louis, Missouri.

Founded in 1913, it entered the St. Louis Soccer League two years later, winning seven league titles and one National Challenge Cup before its disbandment in 1935.

== History ==
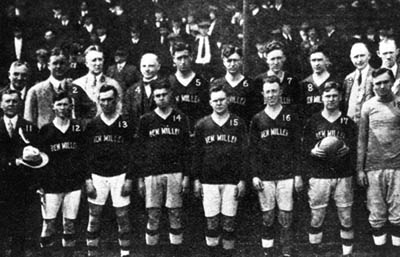
The Ben Millers team of 1920.

A Ben Millers team, managed by E. Brinkman, competed in the St. Louis Association Foot Ball League during the 1904–05 season. In 1913, Ben Millers entered the Athletic Park League in St. Louis, Missouri. The Athletic Park League had been created that season after disagreements about permissible levels of professionalism had split the St. Louis Soccer League.

St. Leo's, the city’s only fully professional team joined with several other St. Louis teams, including Ben Millers, to form the Federal Park League. This league existed only two seasons as the differences dividing the previous SLSL teams were reconciled leading to the re-establishment of the SLSL in 1915. Ben Millers joined the reconstituted SLSL, immediately asserting its dominance by winning three consecutive league titles. While the National Challenge Cup was established by the United States Football Association in 1914, the St. Louis teams did not enter it until 1918.

In 1920, Ben Millers became the first team outside of the northeast to win the trophy. While they never repeated as champions, they made the final in 1926. The team continued strong into the late 1920s but began to fade with the new decade. Frankie Vaughan took over as manager for the 1935–36 season.

== Team ownership ==
Peter Ratican owned Ben Millers in the early 1920s. Following his death in 1923, his widow owned the team for a time.

== Record ==
Season	Record	League	National Cup
1913–14	7–4–2	2nd	did not participate
1914–15	8–3–2	2nd	did not participate
1915–16	12–5–3	Champion	did not participate
1916–17	10–8–2	Champion	did not participate
1917–18	9–5–3	Champion	did not participate
1918–19	5–9–7	4th	did not participate
1919–20	8–6–7	Champion	Champion
1920–21	8–3–6	2nd	did not participate
1921–22	8–7–6	2nd	Fourth Round
1922–23	4–8–5	4th	did not participate
1923–24	2–8–4	4th	did not participate
1924–25	11–4–3	Champion	did not participate
1925–26	8–3–3	Champion	Runners-up
1926–27	8–3–1	Champion	Semifinals
1927–28	5–7–2	3rd	Semifinals
1928–29	5–7–5	3rd	First Round
1929–30	3–4–7	3rd	First Round
1930–31	6–7–4	4th	Semifinal
1931–32	7–7–2	2nd	First Round
1932–33	5–8–2	3rd	First Round
1933–34	6–6–1	2nd	Second Round
1934–35	0–10–4	4th	First Round
1935–36	2–6–0	4th	First Round
