= Chicago Sparta =

American soccer team

The Sparta Athletic and Benevolent Association Football Club, better known as Chicago Sparta, was one of the longest continually established soccer clubs in the United States. Founded in 1917, it was one of the dominant teams from Chicago, Illinois, from the mid-1920s to the late 1940s.

== History ==
In 1915, immigrant Czechs living in Chicago, Illinois, formed a social sports organization which they named the Sparta Athletic and Benevolent Association. In 1917, several players from Chicago Slavia joined Sparta A and BA to form the core of Sparta’s soccer club. This team, known at times as Sparta A and BA or Sparta ABA, is best known simply as Chicago Sparta. In 1922, Sparta joined the Chicago Major League. However, up to 1923, Sparta had remained an undistinguished amateur recreational team. That year, it signed several Czechs who had recently immigrated to the United States. These proved to be exceptional players and they quickly brought Sparta to the top of the city’s soccer hierarchy. At the time, Chicago was dominated by ethnic British leagues, but during the early 1920s, several new leagues were formed to meet the needs of other expatriate teams. There are no records of which of these leagues Sparta played in, but in 1926, it joined the St. Louis Soccer League which was attempting to expand throughout the Midwest United States. Sparta played only four games, a 2-1-1 record, before withdrawing on November 16, 1926. It then joined Chicago's International League, winning nine titles before moving to the new National Soccer League of Chicago in 1937. It won that season's title, then no more. However, by that time, it was gaining attention at the national level, winning the 1938 National Challenge Cup and earning a co-championship in the 1940 National Challenge Cup. In 1938, Sparta rejoined the St. Louis Soccer League. This time, it won the league title, their last in team history. In 1969, Sparta tied for the Peel Cup title with Chicago Kickers, never to win a national or state competition after that year. Sparta was active as late as the late 1980s.

== International Friendlies ==
Several clubs toured North America in the 1920s and 1930s. When large crowds were expected, events were scheduled to take place at venues such as Comiskey Park or Soldier Field. On May 6, 1927 Sparta played Hakoah Vienna to a 2-2 draw in front of 12,000 fans at Comiskey Park.

Touring clubs that played Sparta at Sparta Stadium (located at 21st Street & South Kostner) included:

Club	Result	Date	Attendance
Palestra Italia	Lost to Sparta 5-1	September 2, 1928	5,000
Audax (Chile)	Beat Sparta 2-0	September 17, 1933	4,000
SK Kladno (Czech)	Beat Sparta 4-0	September 9, 1934	9,000
Tel-Aviv Maccabees	Tied Sparta 1-1	September 15, 1936	7,000

== Sparta Stadium ==
Sparta Stadium stood at 21st Street and South Kostner. As early as 1921, the Chicago Tribune reported scheduled games and results at "Sparta Field", and games at Sparta Stadium were widely reported throughout the 1920s, 1930s, and 1940s. The largest recorded attendance at Sparta Stadium was 9,000 when Sparta hosted SK Kladno (Czech) on September 9, 1934. The last soccer game the Chicago Tribune reported at Sparta Stadium was in November 1953. Shortly thereafter, Sparta Stadium was leveled and paved as a parking lot for nearby factories.

== Year-by-year ==
Year	League	Reg. season	Peel Cup	National Challenge Cup
1924/25	CML	?	Semifinal	Fourth round
1925/26	CML	?	?	First round
1926-27	SLSL	4th	?	Semifinal
1927/28	ISL	1st	Champion	Quarterfinal
1928/29	ISL	?	Champion	Semifinal
1929/30	ISL	1st	Champion	Second round
1930/31	ISL	1st	Champion	Second round
1931/32	ISL	1st	Champion	Quarterfinals
1932/33	ISL	1st	Champion	Semifinal
1933/34	ISL	1st	?	Quarterfinals
1934/35	ISL	1st	?	Second round
1935/36	ISL	1st	?	Quarterfinals
1936/37	ISL	?	Champion	Semifinals
1937/38	NSL	1st	?	Champion
1938-39	SLSL	1st	Champion	Quarterfinals
1939/40	?	?	?	Champion
1940/41	?	?	?	?
1941/42	?	?	?	?
1942/43	?	?	?	?
1943/44	?	?	?	?
1944/45	?	?	?	?
1945/46	?	?	Champion	?
1946/47	?	?	Champion	Final
1947/48	?	?	Champion	?

== Honors ==
National Challenge Cup

- Winner (2): 1938, 1940
- Runner Up (1): 1947

Peel Cup

- Winner (12): 1928, 1929, 1930, 1931, 1932, 1933, 1937, 1939, 1946, 1947, 1948, 1969

League Championship

- Winner (9): 1928, 1930, 1931, 1932, 1933, 1934, 1935, 1936, 1939
