= Stix, Baer and Fuller F.C. =

American soccer club (1931–1935)

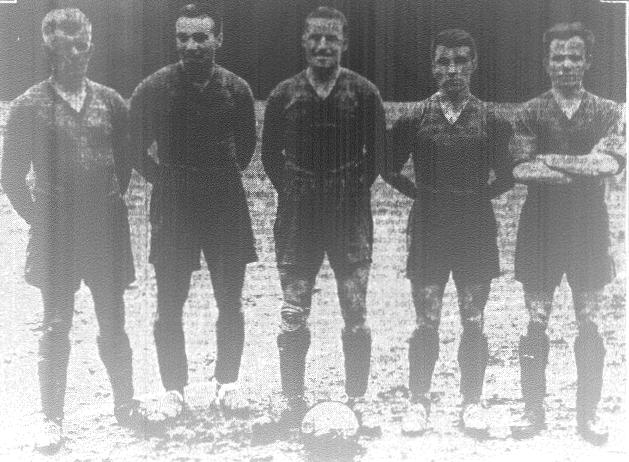
McNab, Gonsalves, Nilsen, Roe, McLean

Stix, Baer and Fuller F.C. was a U.S. soccer club which played in the St. Louis Soccer League from 1931 to 1935. The team was known as Hellrungs from 1929 to 1931, St. Louis Central Breweries F.C. from 1934 to 1935 and St. Louis Shamrocks from 1935 to 1938. During their short existence, they won two National Challenge Cup titles and two league championships as Stix, Baer and Fuller and one National Cup and league title as St. Louis Central Breweries.

== History ==
=== Hellrungs ===
Teams in the St. Louis Soccer League depended on corporate sponsorship. As a result, the teams would frequently change names as their sponsor changed. The team, sponsored by the Hellrung & Grimm House Furnishing Company, was established as Hellrungs in 1929 as a member of the St. Louis Soccer League (SLSL).

=== Stix, Baer and Fuller ===
In 1931, they came under new sponsorship from the Stix, Baer and Fuller, one of the largest St. Louis department stores. Hellrungs had finished the 1930–1931 season third out of four teams in the SLSL. Stix, Baer and Fuller (SBF) would not improve on Hellrungs’ performance, finishing third in the 1931-1932 standings. However, they found considerable success on the national level as they went to the National Challenge Cup finals. In the semifinal series, they won the first game against Chicago's Bricklayers and Masons F.C. 3–1, before losing 2-0 the second game. As the series was tied, the two teams played a deciding game, won by SBF 1–0. In the National Cup finals, SBF ran up against the New Bedford Whalers of the American Soccer League. Whalers was stocked with future Hall of Famers. Despite that, SBF played them to a 3–3 tie in St. Louis before losing 5–2 in the second game, both played in St. Louis. The Whalers folded after the National Cup series and five of their players moved west to join SBF. Bolstered by the influx of talent, SBF ran to the top of the table in the 1932-1933 SLSL season. They also won the National Cup with two victories, 1-0 and 2–1, against the New York Americans. SBF then went on to play the Toronto Scottish in the “North American Soccer Championship” and occasional game which pitted the National Challenge Cup and Canadian championship teams. Toronto won the game 2-1 despite a goal for SBF from Billy Gonsalves. SBF continued both their league and National Cup successes in the 1933–1934 season. They finished at the top of the SLSL table and won the National Cup over the Pawtucket Rangers in three games, a 4–2 victory, 2–3 loss and a 5-0 third game.

=== Central Breweries ===
Following their National Cup victory, the team again changed sponsorship, this time to St. Louis Central Breweries. The newly renamed team continued to find success, winning both the 1935 SLSL and National Cup titles.

=== Shamrocks ===
In October 1935, the team changed sponsorship, starting the season as Democratic Country Club. In mid October the sponsors James A.Burke and John J.Dwyer dropped their connection with the team and for the next month were known simply as St. Louis soccer club. Without financial backing and some of the players otherwise unemployed they considered disbanding. It was in mid November that they withdrew from the league and began an intercity schedule out of Sportsmans Park under the name Father Dempsey's Shamrocks with the backing of Phil A.Riley who had resigned as league president to head up the management of this experimental attempt to run an independent pro team. However, the core of the team remained and the Shamrocks went to the 1936 and 1937 National Cup finals, only to fall to the Philadelphia German-Americans and New York Americans, respectively.

In April 1936 the Shamrock played two matches against the visiting Botafogo FC from Rio de Janeiro with stars like Leônidas da Silva and Carvalho Leite. The Shamrocks won the first match 1-0 and in the second one held the visitors to a 3–3 draw.

In October 1936, the team was without USFA affiliation which was rectified when they joined the Illinois State FA. The Shamrocks continued to compete as an independent playing out of their new grounds at Public Schools Stadium playing their first game of the season October 11 against Oak Park Acorns of Chicago winning 4–0. In November 1936, Shamrocks played the St.Louis League All Stars in the league all star game. Shamrocks won, 3–0, with one local newspaper writing, "The series was well worth while but it only strengthened the belief that no combination of Pro League players could be put together to give the Shamrocks a real test. Even a bit off form, as the Shamrocks were yesterday, they are far superior to any team the league officials might put on the field.” In 1938, the Shamrocks folded after several players left the team to sign with St. Patrick. Shamrocks sued for player tampering, but the team collapsed and the remaining players signed with South Side Radio.

== Record ==
Season	Record	League	National cup
1929–30	5–3–4	2nd	Second round (Note: As "Hellrungs".)
1930–31	7–7–3	3rd	First round
1931–32	6–6–3	3rd	Runners-up
1932–33	10–2–3	Champion	Champion
1933–34	9–2–2	Champion	Champion
1934–35	10–2–3	Champion	Champion (Note: As "St. Louis Central Breweries".)
1935–36	3–0–1	1st	Runners-up (Note: As "St. Louis Shamrocks".)
1936–37			Runners-up

== Honors ==
National Challenge Cup

- Winner (3): 1933, 1934, 1935
- Runner Up (3): 1932, 1936, 1937

League Championship

- Winner (3): 1933, 1934, 1935
