= St. Louis Soccer League =

- Founded: 1915
- Folded: 1938
- Region: St. Louis, Missouri
- Domestic cup: National Challenge Cup
- Most championships: Ben Miller/Tabler F.C./St. Matthew's (7 titles)

The St. Louis Soccer League was a professional soccer league in St. Louis, Missouri. Founded in 1915 With four teams drawn from two amateur leagues, it was at the time the country's only pro soccer league. It folded in 1938.

== History ==
The league arose from a compromise between two rival leagues: the St. Louis Soccer Football League and the Federal Park Soccer League. These two battled for dominance in the 1913-14 season, leading to negotiations throughout the 1914-15 season. These talks produced a plan in March 1915: the top two teams of the St. Louis Soccer Football League, Innisfails and Columbus Club, would join the new U.S. Football Association, and then the top two teams in the Federal Park League, St. Leo's and Ben Millers, to form the St. Louis Soccer League. Winton E. Barker, president of the Federal Park League, was unanimously elected president of the league.

In 1916, the U.S. Football Association assembled a team of U.S. players for Scandinavia, the first for the national team. Among them was Innisfails' Matt Diedrichsen, the only national team member from outside the northeast United States.

The entry of the United States into World War I drained all four teams by drafting players into the military, with St. Leo’s affected the most.

In 1926, the SLSL briefly expanded to include Chicago Sparta, but the team did not complete the season and withdrew on November 11, 1926. In 1935, the SLSL entered a period of instability that led to its dissolution four years later.

In 1939, the league expanded to include teams from Chicago and Cleveland. Teams from these two cities and St. Louis had competed against each other from time to time, but this year, the SLSL decided to formalize the competition, which was called the “Inter-city Soccer Loop”. The league, which had experienced considerable internal strife, including lawsuits between teams over player tampering, had finally collapsed. The St. Louis Municipal League, which ran the lower St. Louis city divisions, became the only league. As such, its top division became the de facto St. Louis first division until the St. Louis Major Soccer League was created in 1948.

== National competition ==
Most teams participated in city, state, or regional competitions before the establishment of the National Challenge Cup in 1914. The only opportunities for teams from one region to test themselves against the best on a national level came from ad hoc cups and off-season tours.

In 1913, the St. Louis Soccer League came to national attention when St. Leo’s tied the Paterson True Blues, winners of the American Cup. At the time, the American Cup was the most recognized regional cup and was the de facto East Coast championship.

While the newly established United States Football Association established the National Challenge Cup in 1914, it was not until 1918 that the St. Louis teams entered the cup. They initially had difficulty getting past the Chicago and Cleveland teams, but in 1920, Ben Millers stunned the East Coast teams by knocking off Fore River to become the first club outside of the northeast to win the cup. SLSL teams then went to the next four finals, taking only the 1922 title. The SLSL team also went to the final in 1926, 1929, and every season from 1932 to 1939.

== Past winners ==
For a list of league standings by year, see List of St. Louis Soccer League seasons.

St. Louis Soccer League winners
Season	Winner	Runner-up
1915–16	Ben Millers	Innisfails
1916–17	Ben Millers	Innisfails
1917–18	Ben Millers	St. Leo's
1918–19	Scullin Steel Co.	Innisfails
1919–20	Ben Millers	Innisfails
1920–21	Scullin Steel Co.	Ben Millers
1921–22	Scullin Steel Co.	De Andreis
1922–23	Vesper-Buick	Scullin Steel Co.
1923–24	Vesper-Buick	Barrett-Hoover
1924–25	Ben Millers	Vesper-Buick
1925–26	Ben Millers	Vesper-Buick
1926–27	Ben Millers	Wellston F.C.
1927–28	Tabler Cleaners	Wellston F.C.
1928–29	Tabler F.C.	Madison Kennel Club
1929–30	Tabler F.C.	Hellrung & Grimm
1930–31	Coca-Cola	Tabler F.C.
1931–32	Coca-Cola	Ben Millers
1932–33	Stix, Baer & Fuller	Anderson
1933–34	Stix, Baer & Fuller	Ben Millers
1934–35	Central Brewers	Marres
1935–36	Burke's Undertakers	Hellrung & Grimm
1936–37	Burke's Undertakers	Club Lotus
1937–38	St. Matthew's	St. Patrick's
1938–39	–	–

== Teams ==
When the St. Louis Soccer League was established, St. Louis boasted many of other leagues. In 1913, the St. Louis Municipal League consolidated many of these disparate leagues into a multi-division organization which sat below the SLSL. Finally, St. Louis soccer teams depended on sponsorship. When sponsorship changed, the teams changed their names as well.

=== Original four teams ===
- Ben Millers (Note: Different team than the 1924-36 Ben Millers team.) 1915–16 through 1923–24

→ Raticans/Pants Store Co. (Note: Began season as simply "Raticans" without a sponsor before taking on a sponsor and renamed as Pants Store Co.) 1924–25
→ Pants Store Co. 1925–26
→ Raticans 1926–27
→ Tabler F.C. (Note: aka Tabler Cleaners) 1927–28 through 1930–31
→ Anderson 1931–32 through 1933-34
→ Marres 1934–35 through 1935-36
→ Town Crier 1936–37
→ St. Matthew's 1937–38

- Innisfails 1915–16 through 1920–21

→ De Andreis 1921–22
→ Barrett-Hoover (Note: aka Hoover Sweepers) 1922–23 through 1923–24
→ Ben Millers (Note: Different team than the 1915-24 Ben Millers team.) 1924–25 through 1935–36

- Missouri Naval Reserves 1915–16 through 1917–18

→ Scullin Steel Co. 1918–19 through 1924–25
→ Wellston F.C. 1925–26 through 1928–29
→ Hellrung & Grimm (Note: Different team than the 1934-36 Hellrung & Grimm team.) 1929–30 through 1930–31
→ Stix, Baer & Fuller 1931–32 through 1933–34
→ Central Brewers 1934–35
→ Democratic Country Club/St. Louis (Note: Played two games as Democratic Club before losing backers. Renamed simply St. Louis while looking for new sponsors. After two games, finds new sponsors, drops out of league to become an independent club, and renamed Father Dempsey's Shamrocks.) 1935–36

- St. Leo's 1915–16 through 1917–18

→ St. Louis Screw Co. 1918–19 through 1921–22
→ Vesper-Buick 1922–23 through 1925–26
→ White Banner Malts 1926–27
→ Morgan Haulers 1927–28
→ Madison Kennel Club 1928–29 through 1929–30
→ Coca-Cola 1930–31 through 1932–33
→ Minit-Rub Stars 1933–34
→ Hellrung & Grimm (Note: Different team than the 1929-31 Hellrung & Grimm team.) 1934–35 through 1935–36
→ Club Lotus 1936–37

=== Later teams ===
- Spanish Sport Club/Burke's Undertakers (Note: Played five games as Spanish Sport club before gaining a sponsor and becoming Burkes.) 1935–36

→ Burke's Undertakers 1936–37 through 1938–39

- German Sport Club 1935–36 (Note: Withdrew from league after three games.)
- Herrmann Undertakers 1935–36 (Note: Withdrew from league after three games.)
- Schumacher Undertakers 1935–36 (Note: Withdrew from league after three games.)
- Eddie Hart's/North Side Optimist Club (Note: Played six games without a sponsor as Eddie Hart's team before gaining a sponsor and becoming South Side.) 1936–37
- St. Patrick's 1937–38

→ Lindell Trust Co. 1938–39

- South Side S.C. 1937–38

== See also ==
- Soccer in St. Louis
