= 1921–22 New York F.C. season =

New York F.C.
1921–22 season
- Stadium: New York Oval
- American Soccer League: 2nd
- National Challenge Cup: Third Round; Eastern Division; Northern and Southern New York District
- Southern New York State Football Association Cup: Winners
- Top goalscorer: League: Archie Stark (13); All: Archie Stark (23)
- Biggest win: 7 goals 7-0 vs. West Harlem Catholic F.C. (16 October 1921)
- Biggest defeat: 2 goals 0-2 vs. J. & P. Coats F.C. (2 October 1921); 3-5 at Todd Shipyards F.C. (11 December 1921); 0-2 at Fall River F.C. (11 March 1922)

The 1921–22 New York F.C. season was the club's first season in the American Soccer League and the inaugural season of the league. The club previously played in the National Association Football League. New York F.C. finished 2nd in the league.

== American Soccer League ==
Date	Opponents	H/A	Result F–A	Scorers	Attendance
18 September 1921	Harrison S.C.	H	2-2	Duggan, A. Stark	
25 September 1921	Celtic F.C.	H	6-2 (Note: Game removed from standings after Jersey City forfeited their franchise in December.)		
1 October 1921	Philadelphia F.C.	A	1-2	Meyerdierks	
2 October 1921	J. & P. Coats F.C.	H	0-2		
9 October 1921	Philadelphia F.C.	H	3-3	Hunziker, Duggan, Rooney	
22 October 1921	J. & P. Coats F.C.	A	0-1		
23 October 1921	Fall River F.C.	H	6-1	Duggan, A. Stark (2), P. Hardy, Burnett (2)	
29 October 1921	Fall River F.C.	A	2-1	A. Stark, Rooney	
30 October 1921	Falco F.C.	A	0-0		
13 November 1921	Todd Shipyards F.C.	H	3-0	P. Hardy, T. Stark, Herd	
19 November 1921	Falco F.C.	A	4-0	A. Stark, P. Hardy (2), Rooney	
18 December 1921	Todd Shipyards F.C.	A	1-2	Duggan	
26 December 1921	J. & P. Coats F.C.	A	1-0	P. Hardy	
1 January 1922	Falco F.C.	H	3-2	P. Hardy, Phlip, Andrews	
2 January 1922	Philadelphia F.C.	A	3-1	Meyerdierks, A. Stark, Andrews	
8 January 1922	Harrison S.C.	A	1-1	P. Hardy	
5 February 1922	Harrison S.C.	H	5-2	A. Stark, Cooper, Burnett, P. Hardy (2)	
12 February 1922	Fall River F.C.	H	6-1	T. Stark, Burnett (2), Phlip, Andrews (2)	
26 February 1922	Todd Shipyards F.C.	A	4-3	A. Stark (2), Burnett, Andrews	
5 March 1922	Harrison S.C.	H	3-1	A. Stark (3)	
11 March 1922	Fall River F.C.	A	0-2		
19 March 1922	Philadelphia F.C.	H	3-2	Duggan (2), Burnett	
26 March 1922	J. & P. Coats F.C.	H	3-2	Kelly, T. Stark, Duggan	
2 April 1922	Todd Shipyards F.C.	H	2-2	Meyerdierks, Burnett	
13 May 1922	Falco F.C.	A	3-0	Duggan, A. Stark, Andrews	

Pos	Club	Pld	W	D	L	GF	GA	GD	Pts
1	Philadelphia F.C.	24	17	4	3	72	36	+36	38
2	New York F.C.	24	14	5	5	59	33	+26	33
3	Todd Shipyards F.C.	24	12	5	7	56	37	+19	29
4	Harrison S.C.	24	8	7	8	45	44	+1	23
5	J. & P. Coats F.C.	23	9	5	9	34	40	-6	23
6	Fall River F.C.	24	5	1	18	28	57	-29	11
7	Falco F.C.	22	2	3	17	17	64	-4'	7
n/a	Celtic F.C.	5	0	0	5	5	24	-19	0

Pld = Matches played; W = Matches won; D = Matches drawn; L = Matches lost; GF = Goals for; GA = Goals against; Pts = Points

== National Challenge Cup ==
Date	Round	Opponents	H/A	Result F–A	Scorers	Attendance
16 October 1921	First Round; Eastern Division; Southern New York District	West Harlem Catholic F.C.	H	7-0		
5 November 1921	Second Round; Eastern Division; Southern New York District	Fairhill F.C.	H	5-1	Cooper (2), A. Stark, Burnett (2)	
27 November 1921	Third Round; Eastern Division; Northern and Southern New York District	Todd Shipyards F.C.	A	postponed		
4 December 1921	Third Round; Eastern Division; Northern and Southern New York District	Todd Shipyards F.C.	A	postponed		
11 December 1921	Third Round; Eastern Division; Northern and Southern New York District	Todd Shipyards F.C.	A	3-5	Cooper, A. Stark, Burnett	

== Southern New York State Football Association Cup ==
Date	Round	Opponents	H/A	Result F–A	Scorers	Attendance
12 March 1922	Second Round	Bay Ridge F.C.	H	4-1		
9 April 1922	Semifinals	Centro-Hispano F.C.	H	5-3		
30 April 1922	Finals	Todd Shipyards F.C.	H	3-0	Andrews, Duggan, T. Stark	50,000

== Exhibitions ==
Date	Opponents	H/A	Result F–A	Scorers	Attendance
11 September 1921	Brooklyn Hibernians	H	2-0	Duggan (2)	

== Notes and references ==
Bibliography

- Jose, Colin (1998). The American Soccer League: The Golden Years of American Soccer 1921-1931. Lanham, Maryland: Scarecrow Press. ISBN 978-0810834293.
- Cahill, Thomas W., ed. (1921). Spalding's Official "Soccer" Football Guide 1921-22. Spalding's "Red Cover" Series of Athletic Handbooks, No. 55R. New York: American Sports Publishing Company.
- Cahill, Thomas W., ed. (1922). Spalding's Official "Soccer" Football Guide 1922-23. Spalding's "Red Cover" Series of Athletic Handbooks, No. 55R. New York: American Sports Publishing Company.

Footnotes
