= 1923–24 National Giants F.C. season =

National Giants F.C.
1923-24 season
- Owner: Adolph Buslik (through February 1924); Maurice Vandeweghe (after February 1924)
- Stadium: Polo Grounds (through February 1924); New York Oval (after February 1924)
- American Soccer League: 6th
- National Challenge Cup: Fourth Round; Eastern Division
- American Cup: Second Round
- Southern New York State Football Association Cup: Semifinals
- Top goalscorer: Cecil Bremner (5); Peter Sweeney (5)
- Biggest win: 3 goals 4-1 at Nassau F.C. (11 November 1923)
- Biggest defeat: 5 goals 0-5 at New York S.C. (6 January 1924)

The 1923–24 National Giants F.C. season was the second season for the club in the American Soccer League but its first season in New York after playing the previous season as Paterson F.C. Following the 1922-23 season, owner Adolph Buslik transferred the Paterson F.C. franchise to New York and renamed them the National Giants F.C.

At the end of February 1924, Buslik sold the franchise to Maurice Vandeweghe. Prior to the purchase, Vandeweghe had been part-owner and manager of New York S.C. The club's home grounds had been the Polo Grounds, but after the sale, the club played at New York Oval on alternating Sundays with New York S.C. The club finished the season in 6th place.

== American Soccer League ==
Date	Opponents	H/A	Result F–A	Scorers	Attendance
6 October 1923	J. & P. Coats F.C.	A	2-2	Heaps (2)	
7 October 1923	Fall River F.C.	A	1-2	McNiven	
13 October 1923	Philadelphia F.C.	A	3-2	Heaps (2), Sweeney	
21 October 1923	Bethlehem Steel F.C.	H	2-2	McAusian, McNiven	
28 October 1923	New York S.C.	H	0-2		5,000
3 November 1923	Bethlehem Steel F.C.	A	1-5	Sweeney	
4 November 1923	Newark F.C.	A	0-1		
18 November 1923	New York S.C.	A	1-4	own goal	
25 November 1923	Philadelphia F.C.	H	2-2	Pepper, Hunziker	
16 December 1923	J. & P. Coats F.C.	H	3-1	Gallagher, Pepper (2)	
23 December 1923	Brooklyn Wanderers F.C.	A	2-2	Cameron, Forrest	
29 December 1923	J. & P. Coats F.C.	A	0-3		
30 December 1923	Fall River F.C.	A	2-4	Sweeney, McKinney	
6 January 1924	New York S.C.	A	0-5		
13 January 1924	Fall River F.C.	A	0-4		
19 January 1924	Bethlehem Steel F.C.	A	1-3	Bremner	
9 February 1924	Philadelphia F.C.	A	3-2	Fryer (2), Cavanaugh	
16 March 1924	Brooklyn Wanderers F.C.	A	0-1		2,000
30 March 1924	Bethlehem Steel F.C.	H	1-1	Moorhouse	
6 April 1924	Philadelphia F.C.	H	2-1	Bremner, Crilley	2,000
13 April 1924	Brooklyn Wanderers F.C.	H	4-2	Sweeney (2), Bremner, Millar	5,000
4 May 1924	Newark F.C.	A	1-0	Bremner	
18 May 1924	Brooklyn Wanderers F.C.	H	0-2		
25 May 1924	New York S.C.	A	2-4	Moorhouse (2)	
1 June 1924	Newark F.C.	H	2-2	Bremner, Millar	
8 June 1924	J. & P. Coats F.C.	H	1-5	Millar	

Pos	Club	Pld	W	D	L	GF	GA	GD	Pts
1	Fall River F.C.	27	19	6	2	59	19	+40	44
2	Bethlehem Steel F.C.	28	18	4	6	63	33	+30	40
3	New York S.C.	28	15	8	5	67	39	+28	38
4	J. & P. Coats F.C.	25	11	5	9	59	54	+5	27
5	Brooklyn Wanderers F.C.	27	9	5	13	47	57	-10	23
6	National Giants F.C.	26	6	6	14	36	64	-28	18
7	Philadelphia F.C.	26	5	3	18	30	64	-34	13
8	Newark F.C.	23	3	1	19	20	53	-33	7

Pld = Matches played; W = Matches won; D = Matches drawn; L = Matches lost; GF = Goals for; GA = Goals against; Pts = Points

== National Challenge Cup ==
Date	Round	Opponents	H/A	Result F–A	Scorers	Attendance
???	First Round; Eastern Division; Southern New York District	Victoria Sport Club	H	???		
11 November 1923	Second Round; Eastern Division; Southern New York District	Nassau F.C.	A	4-1	Paton (2), Sweeney (2)	
2 December 1923	Third Round; Eastern Division; Southern New York and Connecticut District	Ansonia F.C.	A	1-0	Sweeney	
25 December 1923	Fourth Round; Eastern Division	Newark F.C.	H	2-5	McAusian, Forrest	2,000

== American Football Association Cup ==
Date	Round	Opponents	H/A	Result F–A	Scorers	Attendance
9 December 1923	Second Round	New York S.C.	at Polo Grounds	2-3	Sweeney, Robb	

== Southern New York State Football Association Cup ==
Date	Round	Opponents	H/A	Result F–A	Scorers	Attendance
11 May 1924	Fourth Round	Yonkers F.C.	H	1-0		
15 June 1924	Semifinals	New York S.C.	A	0-3		

== Exhibitions ==
Date	Opponents	H/A	Result F–A	Scorers	Attendance
7 November 1923	New York S.C.	A	1-4	Paton	3,000

== Notes and references ==
Bibliography

- Jose, Colin (1998). The American Soccer League: The Golden Years of American Soccer 1921-1931. Lanham, Maryland: Scarecrow Press. ISBN 978-0810834293.
- Cahill, Thomas W., ed. (1923). Spalding's Official "Soccer" Football Guide 1923-24. Spalding's "Red Cover" Series of Athletic Handbooks, No. 55R. New York: American Sports Publishing Company.

Footnotes
