= 1923–24 New York S.C. season =

New York S.C.
1923-24 season
- Owner: Hugh Magee & Maurice Vandeweghe (through February 1924); Hugh Magee (after February 1924)
- Manager: Hugh Magee
- Stadium: New York Oval
- American Soccer League: 3rd
- National Challenge Cup: Fourth Round; Eastern Division
- American Cup: Semifinals
- Southern New York State Football Association Cup: Winners
- Top goalscorer: Archie Stark (21)
- Biggest win: 6 goals 6-0 vs. Philadelphia F.C. (4 November 1923); 6-0 vs. Lexington F.C. (11 May 1924)
- Biggest defeat: 3 goals 1-3 vs. Bethlehem Steel F.C. (8 June 1924)

The 1923–24 New York S.C. season was the third and last season for the club in the American Soccer League. At the end of February 1924, Adolph Buslik sold the National Giants F.C. franchise to Maurice Vandeweghe. Prior to the purchase, Vandeweghe had been part-owner and manager of New York S.C. with Hugh Magee. The club finished the season in 3rd place.

In the off-season, the franchise was sold to the Indiana Flooring Company who had fielded a club in the 1923–24 season of the First Division of the New York State Association Football League and won that league.

== American Soccer League ==
Date	Opponents	H/A	Result F–A	Scorers	Attendance
7 October 1923	Newark F.C.	H	2-0	Stark, McGhee	
13 October 1923	Bethlehem Steel F.C.	A	3-4	Duggan, Stark, McGhee	
14 October 1923	Bethlehem Steel F.C.	H	4-2	Duggan, Stark (2), McGhee	
28 October 1923	National Giants F.C.	A	2-0	Duggan, Stark	5,000
4 November 1923	Philadelphia F.C.	H	6-0	Herd, Duggan, Stark (2), McGhee, McNiven	
18 November 1923	National Giants F.C.	H	4-1	Duggan (3), McGhee	
25 November 1923	Fall River F.C.	A	1-1	Duggan	
8 December 1923	Philadelphia F.C.	A	0-1		
16 December 1923	Newark F.C.	A	3-1	Terris, Stark (2), McNiven	
23 December 1923	J. & P. Coats F.C.	H	3-3	Duggan (3), McGhee, McNiven	
6 January 1924	National Giants F.C.	H	5-0	McGhee (2), McNiven (2), Hosie	
13 January 1924	Newark F.C.	A	3-2	Stark, McGhee, McNiven	
19 January 1924	Philadelphia F.C.	H	0-0		
27 January 1924	Fall River F.C.	H	2-2	Stark, McGhee	
17 February 1924	Brooklyn Wanderers F.C.	A	4-3	Herd, Duggan (2), Stark	
1 March 1924	Philadelphia F.C.	A	1-1	Stark	
16 March 1924	J. & P. Coats F.C.	H	3-3	Duggan (2), McGhee	
30 March 1924	Brooklyn Wanderers F.C.	A	1-1	Stark	3,000
6 April 1924	Brooklyn Wanderers F.C.	H	3-1	Terris, Stark (2)	2,000
13 April 1924	Newark F.C.	H	1-0	Duggan	
26 April 1924	Bethlehem Steel F.C.	A	1-0	Stark	
4 May 1924	Fall River F.C.	A	1-3	Stark	
May 1924	J. & P. Coats F.C.	H	2-0		
17 May 1924	J. & P. Coats F.C.	A	1-3	Stark	
18 May 1924	Fall River F.C.	A	0-0		
25 May 1924	National Giants F.C.	H	4-2	Stark (2), McNiven (2)	
1 June 1924	Brooklyn Wanderers F.C.	H	6-1	Stark, McGhee, McNiven (3), Hosie	
8 June 1924	Bethlehem Steel F.C.	H	1-4	Herd	

Pos	Club	Pld	W	D	L	GF	GA	GD	Pts
1	Fall River F.C.	27	19	6	2	59	19	+40	44
2	Bethlehem Steel F.C.	28	18	4	6	63	33	+30	40
3	New York S.C.	28	15	8	5	67	39	+28	38
4	J. & P. Coats F.C.	25	11	5	9	59	54	+5	27
5	Brooklyn Wanderers F.C.	27	9	5	13	47	57	-10	23
6	National Giants F.C.	26	6	6	14	36	64	-28	18
7	Philadelphia F.C.	26	5	3	18	30	64	-34	13
8	Newark F.C.	23	3	1	19	20	53	-33	7

Pld = Matches played; W = Matches won; D = Matches drawn; L = Matches lost; GF = Goals for; GA = Goals against; Pts = Points

== National Challenge Cup ==
Date	Round	Opponents	H/A	Result F–A	Scorers	Attendance
???	First Round; Eastern Division; Southern New York District	Hispano F.C.	H	???		
11 November 1923	Second Round; Eastern Division; Southern New York District	Indiana Flooring Company F.C.	H	3-0	Meyerdierks, Stark, Hosie	
2 December 1923	Third Round; Eastern Division; Southern New York and Connecticut District	Brooklyn Wanderers F.C.	A	1-0	Stark	6,000
25 December 1923	Fourth Round; Eastern Division	Bethlehem Steel F.C.	A	2-2 (aet)	Duggan, Stark	
30 December 1923	Fourth Round; Eastern Division (replay)	Bethlehem Steel F.C.	H	3-4	Herd, Duggan, McNiven	6,000

== American Football Association Cup ==
Date	Round	Opponents	H/A	Result F–A	Scorers	Attendance
9 December 1923	Second Round	New York S.C.	at Polo Grounds	3-2	own goal, Duggan, McGhee	
3 February 1924	Third Round	Brooklyn Wanderers F.C.	H	2-0	Duggan, Stark	
???	Fourth Round	American A.A.	H	???		
20 April 1924	Semifinals	Bethlehem Steel F.C.	H	0-1		

== Southern New York State Football Association Cup ==
Date	Round	Opponents	H/A	Result F–A	Scorers	Attendance
11 May 1924	Fourth Round	Lexington F.C.	H	6-0		
15 June 1924	Semifinals	National Giants F.C.	H	3-0		
20 June 1924	Final	Brooklyn Wanderers F.C.	H	3-2	McNiven (3)	

== Exhibitions ==
Date	Opponents	H/A	Result F–A	Scorers	Attendance
30 September 1923	Brooklyn F.C.	H	???		
7 November 1923	National Giants F.C.	H	4-1	McNiven (2), Cheriton, Stark	3,000

== Notes and references ==
Bibliography

- Jose, Colin (1998). The American Soccer League: The Golden Years of American Soccer 1921-1931. Lanham, Maryland: Scarecrow Press. ISBN 978-0810834293.
- Cahill, Thomas W., ed. (1923). Spalding's Official "Soccer" Football Guide 1923-24. Spalding's "Red Cover" Series of Athletic Handbooks, No. 55R. New York: American Sports Publishing Company.

Footnotes
