= 1921–22 J. & P. Coats F.C. season =

J. & P. Coats F.C.
1921-22 season
- Stadium: Coats Field
- American Soccer League: 5th
- National Challenge Cup: Fourth Round; Eastern Division; New England District
- Top goalscorer: Bob Millar (10)
- Biggest win: 3 goals 3-0 vs. Fall River Rovers F.C. (15 October 1921)
- Biggest defeat: 4 goals 2-6 at Philadelphia F.C. (24 September 1921)

The 1921–22 J. & P. Coats F.C. season was the club's first season in the American Soccer League and the inaugural season of the league. The club previously played in the Southern New England Soccer League. J. & P. Coats F.C. finished 5th in the league.

== American Soccer League ==
Date	Opponents	H/A	Result F–A	Scorers	Attendance
17 September 1921	Philadelphia F.C.	H	0-3		
24 September 1921	Philadelphia F.C.	A	2-6	Bob Millar	
1 October 1921	Todd Shipyards F.C.	H	0-0		
2 October 1921	New York F.C.	A	2-0	Mitchell, Kershaw	
22 October 1921	New York F.C.	H	1-0	Weall	
23 October 1921	Todd Shipyards F.C.	A	1-4	Bob Millar	
29 October 1921	Celtic F.C.	H	4-0 (Note: Game removed from standings after Jersey City forfeited their franchise in December.)		
30 October 1921	Harrison S.C.	A	1-1	Mitchell	
12 November 1921	Fall River F.C.	A	1-4	Bob Millar	
19 November 1921	Harrison S.C.	H	1-1	McIntosh	
3 December 1921	Fall River F.C.	H	4-2	Lappin, Bob Millar (2), Shepard	
17 December 1921	Falco F.C.	H	3-1	Weall (2), Shepard	
26 December 1921	New York F.C.	H	0-1		
31 December 1921	Todd Shipyards F.C.	H	3-2	Bob Millar, Kershaw, Lappin	
2 January 1922	Harrison S.C.	H	2-2	Lappin, A. Sandeman	
7 January 1922	Philadelphia F.C.	A	1-3	Lappin	
8 January 1922	Todd Shipyards F.C.	A	1-0	Shepard	
28 January 1922	Fall River F.C.	A	2-1	Bob Millar, Weall	
28 February 1922	Harrison S.C.	A	1-2	Mitchell	
12 March 1922	Falco F.C.	H	1-1	Bob Millar	
18 March 1922	Fall River F.C.	H	2-1	Mitchell, Bob Millar	
26 March 1922	New York F.C.	A	2-3	Lappin, Kershaw	
15 April 1922	Falco F.C.	A	2-0	Mitchell, Bob Millar	
6 May 1922	Philadelphia F.C.	A	1-2	Lappin	

Pos	Club	Pld	W	D	L	GF	GA	GD	Pts
1	Philadelphia F.C.	24	17	4	3	72	36	+36	38
2	New York F.C.	24	14	5	5	59	33	+26	33
3	Todd Shipyards F.C.	24	12	5	7	56	37	+19	29
4	Harrison S.C.	24	8	7	8	45	44	+1	23
5	J. & P. Coats F.C.	23	9	5	9	34	40	-6	23
6	Fall River F.C.	24	5	1	18	28	57	-29	11
7	Falco F.C.	22	2	3	17	17	64	-4'	7
n/a	Celtic F.C.	5	0	0	5	5	24	-19	0

Pld = Matches played; W = Matches won; D = Matches drawn; L = Matches lost; GF = Goals for; GA = Goals against; Pts = Points

== National Challenge Cup ==
Date	Round	Opponents	H/A	Result F–A	Scorers	Attendance
15 October 1921	First Round; Eastern Division; Southern New England District	Fall River Rovers F.C.	H	3-0	Mitchell, Weall, Kershaw	
5 November 1921	Second Round; Eastern Division; Southern New England District	St. Michaels F.C.	A	2-0	Mitchell (2)	
26 November 1921	Third Round; Eastern Division; Southern New England District	Fall River F.C.	A	2-1	Kershaw	
24 December 1921	Fourth Round; Eastern Division; New England District	Falco F.C.	H	3-4	Lappin (2), Bob Millar	

== Notes and references ==
Bibliography

- Jose, Colin (1998). The American Soccer League: The Golden Years of American Soccer 1921-1931. Lanham, Maryland: Scarecrow Press. ISBN 978-0810834293.
- Cahill, Thomas W., ed. (1921). Spalding's Official "Soccer" Football Guide 1921-22. Spalding's "Red Cover" Series of Athletic Handbooks, No. 55R. New York: American Sports Publishing Company.
- Cahill, Thomas W., ed. (1922). Spalding's Official "Soccer" Football Guide 1922-23. Spalding's "Red Cover" Series of Athletic Handbooks, No. 55R. New York: American Sports Publishing Company.

Notes

Footnotes
