= 1922–23 New York S.C. season =

New York S.C.
1922–23 season
- Secretary: Hugh Magee
- Manager: Maurice Vandeweghe
- Stadium: New York Oval
- American Soccer League: 4th
- National Challenge Cup: Semifinal; Eastern Division; New York and New Jersey District
- Southern New York State Football Association Cup: Runners-up
- Top goalscorer: Bart McGhee (6); Archie Stark (6)
- Biggest win: 6 goals 9-3 vs. St. George F.C. (12 November 1922)
- Biggest defeat: 4 goals 1-5 at J. & P. Coats F.C. (12 May 1923)

The 1922–23 New York S.C. season was the second season for the club in the American Soccer League. Prior to the season the club switched from their traditional New York Football Club name to the new New York Soccer Club name. The club finished the season in 4th place.

== American Soccer League ==
Date	Opponents	H/A	Result F–A	Scorers	Attendance
8 October 1922	Philadelphia F.C.	H	5-0	T. Stark, McAusian, A. Stark, P. Hardy, McGhee	
21 October 1922	J. & P. Coats F.C.	A	2-0	P. Hardy, McGhee	
22 October 1922	Fall River F.C.	A	4-2	A. Stark, P. Hardy, McGhee, McKelvey	
29 October 1922	Bethlehem Steel F.C.	H	0-1		
11 November 1922	Philadelphia F.C.	A	2-2	Coleman, Mitchell	
19 November 1922	Brooklyn Wanderers F.C.	A	1-1	A. Stark	
3 December 1922	Paterson F.C.	H	3-0	A. Stark, McGhee, Mitchell	
10 December 1922	Paterson F.C.	H	3-6	McAusian, P. Hardy, Mitchell	
25 December 1922	Brooklyn Wanderers F.C.	A	3-2	A. Stark, Coleman (2)	
31 December 1922	Philadelphia F.C.	A	4-1	A. Stark, McGhee (2), Coleman	
3 February 1923	Bethlehem Steel F.C.	A	3-3	A. Stark, McGhee, McKelvey	
4 February 1923	Harrison S.C.	A	4-0	McAusian (3), A. Stark	
4 March 1923	Bethlehem Steel F.C.	H	0-1		
24 March 1923	Bethlehem Steel F.C.	A	1-2	Mitchell	
8 April 1923	Philadelphia F.C.	H	6-1	Phlip, A. Stark, McGhee (3), H. Kelly	
15 April 1923	Fall River F.C.	H	1-3	McGhee	
22 April 1923	J. & P. Coats F.C.	H	1-2	Mitchell	
29 April 1923	Harrison S.C.	H	1-3	McAusian	
6 May 1923	Fall River F.C.	H	2-2	Crilley (2)	
12 May 1923	J. & P. Coats F.C.	A	1-5	Crilley	
13 May 1923	Fall River F.C.	A	0-3		
20 May 1923	J. & P. Coats F.C.	H	3-1	McAusian, Crilley, McGuire	
27 May 1923	Brooklyn Wanderers F.C.	H	3-1	Stark (2), Crilley	

Pos	Club	Pld	W	D	L	GF	GA	GD	Pts
1	J. & P. Coats F.C.	28	21	2	5	68	30	+38	44
2	Bethlehem Steel F.C.	28	18	6	4	59	26	+33	42
3	Fall River F.C.	28	15	5	8	53	36	+17	35
4	New York S.C.	23	10	4	9	53	42	+11	24
5	Paterson F.C.	20	9	4	7	38	31	+7	22
6	Brooklyn Wanderers F.C.	25	5	5	15	24	52	-28	15
7	Harrison S.C.	23	4	2	17	26	56	-30	10
8	Philadelphia F.C.	25	3	2	20	24	72	-48	8

Pld = Matches played; W = Matches won; D = Matches drawn; L = Matches lost; GF = Goals for; GA = Goals against; Pts = Points

== National Challenge Cup ==
Date	Round	Opponents	H/A	Result F–A	Scorers	Attendance
15 October 1922	First Round; Eastern Division; Southern New York District	Viking A.C.	H	8-1 (Note: Protested and ordered replayed.)		
5 November 1922	First Round; Eastern Division; Southern New York District (replay)	Viking A.C.	H	4-0		
12 November 1922	Second Round; Eastern Division; Southern New York District	St. George F.C.	H	9-3	T. Stark, McAusian (2), A. Stark (2), Burnett (2), P. Hardy (2)	
26 November 1922	Third Round; Eastern Division; New York, New Jersey and Eastern Pennsylvania District	Brooklyn F.C.	H	1-0		
24 December 1922	Fourth Round; Eastern Division; New York, New Jersey, Eastern Pennsylvania and Connecticut District	Bethlehem Steel F.C.	H	4-1	McAusian (2), A. Stark, McGhee	6,000
11 March 1923	Semifinals; Eastern Division; New York and New Jersey District	Paterson F.C.	at Harrison, N.J.	0-0		
18 March 1923	Semifinals; Eastern Division; New York and New Jersey District (replay)	Paterson F.C.	at Harrison, N.J.	1-4	Phlip	

== Southern New York State Football Association Cup ==
Date	Round	Opponents	H/A	Result F–A	Scorers	Attendance
10 June 1923	Third Round	Bay Ridge F.C.	H	3-0		
24 June 1923	Semifinals	Hispano F.C.	H	???		
1 July 1923	Final	Brooklyn Wanderers F.C.	H	1-1 (aet)	McGhee	
8 July 1923	Final (replay)	Brooklyn Wanderers F.C.	H	???		

== Exhibitions ==
Date	Opponents	H/A	Result F–A	Scorers	Attendance
1 October 1922	Calpe American F.C.	H	7-2		
14 October 1922	Dick, Kerr Ladies F.C.	H	4-8		

== Notes and references ==
Bibliography

- Jose, Colin (1998). The American Soccer League: The Golden Years of American Soccer 1921-1931. Lanham, Maryland: Scarecrow Press. ISBN 978-0810834293.
- Cahill, Thomas W., ed. (1922). Spalding's Official "Soccer" Football Guide 1922-23. Spalding's "Red Cover" Series of Athletic Handbooks, No. 55R. New York: American Sports Publishing Company.
- Cahill, Thomas W., ed. (1923). Spalding's Official "Soccer" Football Guide 1923-24. Spalding's "Red Cover" Series of Athletic Handbooks, No. 55R. New York: American Sports Publishing Company.

Footnotes
