= Harry Chatton =

Irish footballer

Personal information
- Full name: James Harold A. Chatton
- Date of birth: 23 April 1899
- Place of birth: Enniskillen, Ireland
- Date of death: 1983
- Place of death: Dumbarton, Scotland
- Positions: Right-half; centre-half

Youth career
- Kirkintilloch Rob Roy

Senior career*
Years	Team	Apps	(Gls)
1920–1923	Dumbarton	73	(5)
1923–1926	Partick Thistle	89	(3)
1926–1927	Indiana Flooring	31	(1)
1927	Hearts	0	(0)
1927–1930	New York Nationals	114	(0)
1930–1931	Shelbourne	23	(0)
1931–1933	Dumbarton	63	(0)
1933–1934	Cork F.C.		

International career
1924–1925	Ireland (IFA)	3	(0)
1931–1934	Ireland (FAI)	3	(0)
- * Club domestic league appearances and goals

James Harry Chatton (23 April 1899 – 1983), was an Irish footballer who played for several clubs in the Scottish League, the American Soccer League and the League of Ireland. Chatton was a dual internationalist and played for both Ireland teams – the IFA XI and the FAI XI.

== Club career ==
Chatton was born in Enniskillen, County Fermanagh, Ireland but moved to Dumbarton in Scotland with his family during his childhood. After playing with Dumbarton and Partick Thistle in the Scottish League, he joined Indiana Flooring of the American Soccer League in 1926. At the end of the 1926–27 season, he and teammate Alec Donald broke their contracts with Flooring and returned to Scotland to sign with Hearts. The ASL, through the United States Football Association, immediately contested Chatton's contract with Hearts resulting in FIFA voiding the contract. As a result, Chatton returned to Flooring, now known as the New York Nationals. Chatton subsequently helped the Nationals win the 1928 National Challenge Cup, beating Chicago's Bricklayers and Masons F.C. 4–1 on aggregate in the final. In 1929, the Nationals also won the Lewis Cup, the ASL league cup, defeating the New Bedford Whalers over three games. That January, Hearts again attempted to induce Chatton to move to Scotland, but he declined and played one more season in the ASL. On 25 May 1930 at the Polo Grounds, Chatton played for the Nationals in a friendly against Rangers, the reigning Scottish champions. Nationals lost this game 5–4. Among Chatton's teammates at the Nationals were Jimmy Douglas, Jimmy Gallagher, Bart McGhee and Robert Millar. The former three all played for the United States at the 1930 World Cup while Millar was the team coach. After four years in the ASL, Chatton returned to Ireland and joined Shelbourne, helping them win the League of Ireland title in 1931. He then had two further seasons with Dumbarton before joining Cork F.C., who he helped win the FAI Cup in 1934.

== Irish international ==
During the years Chatton played international football, there were, in effect, two Ireland teams, chosen by two rival associations. Both associations, the Northern Ireland – based IFA and the Irish Free State – based FAI claimed jurisdiction over the whole of Ireland and selected players from the whole island. As a result, several notable Irish players from this era, including Chatton, played for both teams.

=== IFA XI ===
Between 1924 and 1925, while playing for Partick Thistle, Chatton played 3 times for the IFA XI. He made his international debut on 22 October 1924 against England in 3–1 defeat at Goodison Park. He won his second cap for the IFA, against Scotland in 3–0 defeat on 28 February 1925 at Windsor Park. He made his final appearance for the IFA XI in a 0–0 draw with England on 24 October 1925, again at Windsor Park. His teammates while playing for the IFA XI included, among others, Tom Farquharson, Mick O'Brien, Bill Lacey, Elisha Scott and Billy Gillespie.

=== FAI XI ===
Between 1931 and 1934 Chatton also played 3 times for the FAI XI. He won each of his three FAI caps while playing for three different clubs – Shelbourne, Dumbarton and Cork F.C. Chatton made his debut for the FAI XI against Spain on 26 April 1931. He helped a team that also included Tom Farquharson, Peter Kavanagh and Paddy Moore, gain a respectable 1–1 draw at the Montjuic Stadium in Barcelona. On 13 December 1931 at Dalymount Park he then captained the FAI XI in the return game against Spain; this time, however, his team lost 5–0. He made his third and final appearance for the FAI XI against the Netherlands on 8 April 1934 in a World Cup qualifier which ended in a 5–2 defeat.

== Honours ==
New York Nationals

- National Challenge Cup
  - Winners 1928: 1
- Lewis Cup
  - Winners 1929: 1

Shelbourne

- League of Ireland
  - Winners 1930–31: 1

Dumbarton

- Dumbartonshire Cup
  - Winners 1931–32;1932-33: 2

Cork F.C.

- FAI Cup
  - Winners 1933–34: 1
