= 1921–22 Philadelphia F.C. season =

Philadelphia F.C.
1921-22 season
- Stadium: National League Park
- American Soccer League: Winners
- National Challenge Cup: Fourth Round; Eastern Division; New York, New Jersey and Pennsylvania District
- Top goalscorer: Harold Brittan (27)
- Biggest win: 6 goals 8-2 vs. Kingessing F.C. (15 October 1921)
- Biggest defeat: 3 goals 1-4 at Todd Shipyards F.C. (26 December 1921); 3-6 at Todd Shipyards F.C. (5 February 1922)

The 1921–22 Philadelphia F.C. season was the first season for Philadelphia F.C. and its first season in the American Soccer League (ASL). Finishing with a record of 17 wins, 4 draws and 2 losses (38 points in the ASL standings), Philadelphia finished well ahead of second-place New York F.C. (14-5-5 and 33 points) and won the pennant, ending the season on May 8, 1922, with a 2 to 1 win over the J. & P. Coats team in Pawtucket before 4,000 fans The team had clinched the pennant on April 22 with a 3 to 0 victory over the Holyoke Falcos for their 16th win of the season.

The league was originally to have included the Bethlehem Steel F.C. but, just before the season started, Bethlehem Steel dropped out of the league and was replaced by Falco F.C. The Bethlehem Steel officials disbanded the club and threw their resources behind the Philadelphia F.C. Most of the best Bethlehem Steel players were signed to Philadelphia F.C.

Philadelphia F.C. won the league, but it was the only season for the club in that incarnation. Following the season, the Philadelphia club was transferred "back" to Bethlehem and a new team was organized in Philadelphia to take its place.

== American Soccer League ==
Date	Opponents	H/A	Result F–A	Scorers	Attendance
17 September 1921	J. & P. Coats F.C.	A	3-0	Campbell (3)	
24 September 1921	J. & P. Coats F.C.	H	6-2	Brittan (2), Forrest (2), Campbell, Fleming	
1 October 1921	New York F.C.	H	2-1	Brittan (2)	
2 October 1921	Todd Shipyards F.C.	A	2-0	Brittan, Fleming	
9 October 1921	New York F.C.	A	3-3	Bethune, Brittan (2)	
22 October 1921	Falco F.C.	H	5-1	Brittan (2), Murray, Morley, Fleming	
29 October 1921	Harrison S.C.	H	3-1	Forrest, Brittan, Fleming (pk)	
13 November 1921	Harrison S.C.	A	3-0	Murray, Brittan (2)	
19 November 1921	Fall River F.C.	A	1-0	Brittan	
3 December 1921	Falco F.C.	A	5-3	Brittan (2), Campbell (2), Collier	
10 December 1921	Fall River F.C.	H	3-1	Fleming, Campbell, Brittan	
17 December 1921	Todd Shipyards F.C.	H	1-1	Fleming	
2 January 1922	New York F.C.	H	1-3	Murray	
7 January 1922	J. & P. Coats F.C.	H	3-1	Fleming, Campbell (2)	
21 January 1922	Fall River F.C.	A	2-1	W. Rice	
5 February 1922	Todd Shipyards F.C.	A	3-6	Fleming (2), Forrest	
11 February 1922	Fall River F.C.	H	5-2	Morley, Brittan (2), Campbell, Lorimer	
11 March 1922	Harrison S.C.	H	6-3	Brittan (5), Fleming	
12 March 1922	Harrison S.C.	A	2-2	Brittan, Neilson	
19 March 1922	New York F.C.	A	2-3	Morley, Brittan	
25 March 1922	Falco F.C.	H	5-0	Brittan, Fleming (3), Neilson	
1 April 1922	Todd Shipyards F.C.	H	1-1	Brittan	
22 April 1922	Falco F.C.	A	3-0	Murray, Fleming, Lorimer	
6 May 1922	J. & P. Coats F.C.	A	2-1	Fleming, Jaap	

Pos	Club	Pld	W	D	L	GF	GA	GD	Pts
1	Philadelphia F.C.	24	17	4	3	72	36	+36	38
2	New York F.C.	24	14	5	5	59	33	+26	33
3	Todd Shipyards F.C.	24	12	5	7	56	37	+19	29
4	Harrison S.C.	24	8	7	8	45	44	+1	23
5	J. & P. Coats F.C.	23	9	5	9	34	40	-6	23
6	Fall River F.C.	24	5	1	18	28	57	-29	11
7	Falco F.C.	22	2	3	17	17	64	-47	7
n/a	Celtic F.C.	5	0	0	5	5	24	-19	0

Pld = Matches played; W = Matches won; D = Matches drawn; L = Matches lost; GF = Goals for; GA = Goals against; Pts = Points

== National Challenge Cup ==
Date	Round	Opponents	H/A	Result F–A	Scorers	Attendance
15 October 1921	First Round; Eastern Division; Eastern Pennsylvania District	Kingessing F.C.	H	8-2		
5 November 1921	Second Round; Eastern Division; Eastern Pennsylvania District	M. E. Smith F.C.	H	4-1		
26 November 1921	Third Round; Eastern Division; Eastern Pennsylvania District	Fleisher Yarn F.C.	A	5-0		
26 December 1921	Fourth Round; Eastern Division; New York, New Jersey and Pennsylvania District	Todd Shipyards F.C.	H	1-4	Forrest	

== Notes and references ==
Bibliography

- Jose, Colin (1998). The American Soccer League: The Golden Years of American Soccer 1921-1931. Lanham, Maryland: Scarecrow Press. ISBN 978-0810834293.
- Cahill, Thomas W., ed. (1921). Spalding's Official "Soccer" Football Guide 1921-22. Spalding's "Red Cover" Series of Athletic Handbooks, No. 55R. New York: American Sports Publishing Company.
- Cahill, Thomas W., ed. (1922). Spalding's Official "Soccer" Football Guide 1922-23. Spalding's "Red Cover" Series of Athletic Handbooks, No. 55R. New York: American Sports Publishing Company.

Footnotes
