= 1921–22 Falco F.C. season =

Falco F.C.
1921-22 season
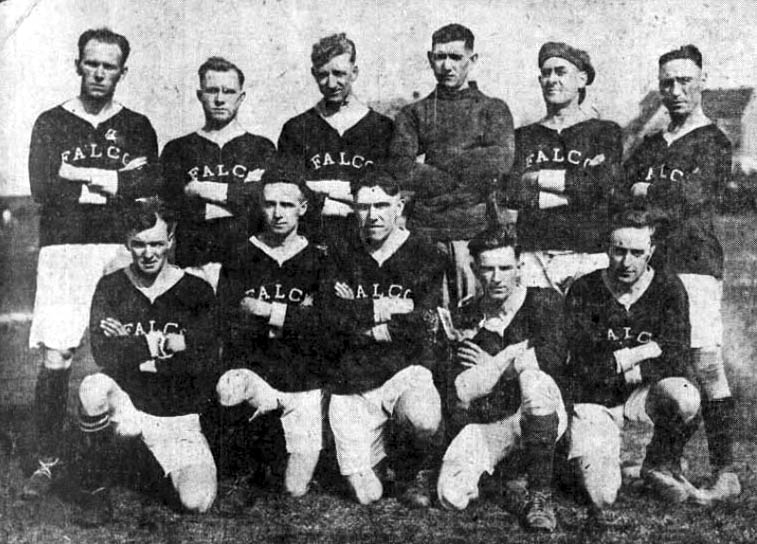
- Owner: Farr Alpaca Company
- Manager: Charley Burnett
- Stadium: Farr Alpaca Athletic Field
- American Soccer League: 7th
- National Challenge Cup: Semifinals; Eastern Division; New England District
- Northern Massachusetts and New Hampshire State Cup: Winners
- Top goalscorer: Jimmy Downie (7)
- Biggest win: 6 goals 8-2 at Hartford F.C. (5 November 1921)
- Biggest defeat: 7 goals 0-7 at Harrison S.C. (26 December 1921)

The 1921–22 season was Falco F.C.'s first and only season in the American Soccer League.

Falco F.C. finished last in the league. The club withdrew from the league after the season and the ASL franchise was taken over by Adolph Buslik, owner and manager of Paterson F.C.

== American Soccer League ==
Date	Opponents	H/A	Result F–A	Scorers	Attendance
17 September 1921	Fall River F.C.	A	3-2	E. Logan, Downie, J. Brown	1,100
24 September 1921	Fall River F.C.	H	0-2		
1 October 1921	Celtic F.C.	H	3-1 (Note: Game removed from standings after Jersey City forfeited their franchise in December.)		
8 October 1921	Harrison S.C.	H	1-3	Downie	
9 October 1921	Todd Shipyards F.C.	A	0-0		
22 October 1921	Philadelphia F.C.	A	1-5	Downie	
29 October 1921	Todd Shipyards F.C.	H	1-4	Downie	
30 October 1921	New York F.C.	A	0-0		
19 November 1921	New York F.C.	H	0-4		
3 December 1921	Philadelphia F.C.	H	3-5	A. Moir (2), Downie	
17 December 1921	J. & P. Coats F.C.	A	1-3	William Dowdall	
26 December 1921	Harrison S.C.	A	0-7		
1 January 1922	New York F.C.	A	2-3	Walt Dowdall, Downie	
12 March 1922	J. & P. Coats F.C.	A	1-1	Walt Dowdall	
18 March 1922	Harrison S.C.	H	1-2	J. Brown	
25 March 1922	Philadelphia F.C.	A	0-5		
26 March 1922	Todd Shipyards F.C.	A	0-4		
15 April 1922	J. & P. Coats F.C.	H	0-2		
19 April 1922	Todd Shipyards F.C.	H	3-6	Walt Dowdall, William Dowdall, Downie	
22 April 1922	Philadelphia F.C.	H	0-3		
13 May 1922	New York F.C.	H	0-3		
14 May 1922	Fall River F.C.	H	forfeit win (Note: Game forfeited to Falco F.C. at meeting of ASL on 14 May 1922.)		
14 May 1922	Fall River F.C.	A	forfeit loss (Note: Game forfeited to Fall River at meeting of ASL on 14 May 1922.)		

Pos	Club	Pld	W	D	L	GF	GA	GD	Pts
1	Philadelphia F.C.	24	17	4	3	72	36	+36	38
2	New York F.C.	24	14	5	5	59	33	+26	33
3	Todd Shipyards F.C.	24	12	5	7	56	37	+19	29
4	Harrison S.C.	24	8	7	8	45	44	+1	23
5	J. & P. Coats F.C.	23	9	5	9	34	40	-6	23
6	Fall River F.C.	24	5	1	18	28	57	-29	11
7	Falco F.C.	22	2	3	17	17	64	-47	7
n/a	Celtic F.C.	5	0	0	5	5	24	-19	0

Pld = Matches played; W = Matches won; D = Matches drawn; L = Matches lost; GF = Goals for; GA = Goals against; Pts = Points

== National Challenge Cup ==
Date	Round	Opponents	H/A	Result F–A	Scorers	Attendance
16 October 1921	First Round; Eastern Division; Western New England District	Manchester F.C.	A	2-0		
5 November 1921	Second Round; Eastern Division; Western New England District	Hartford F.C.	A	8-2		
26 November 1921	Third Round; Eastern Division; Connecticut and Western New England District	St. George F.C.	A	5-2	Downie, Hall, J. Brown (3)	
24 December 1921	Fourth Round; Eastern Division; New England District	J. & P. Coats F.C.	A	4-3	Smith, A. Gray, Downie (2)	
5 February 1922	Semifinals; Eastern Division; New England District	Abbot Worsted F.C.	at Pawtucket	1-3	Downie	4,000

== Northern Massachusetts and New Hampshire State Cup ==
Date	Round	Opponents	H/A	Result F–A	Scorers	Attendance
22 October 1921	First Round			bye		
12 November 1921	Second Round	Chicopee Rovers	?	4-0		
10 December 1921	Third Round	Whitin Machine Works F.C.	A	4-2	Bingham (own goal); Smith; ?; ?	350
?	Semifinals	G.E. Thistle	at Lawrence, Mass.	6-1		
29 April 1922	Final	Abbot Worsted F.C.	at Quincy, Mass.	1-1		
6 June 1922	Final (replay)	Abbot Worsted F.C.	?	3-2		

== Notes and references ==
Bibliography

- Jose, Colin (1998). The American Soccer League: The Golden Years of American Soccer 1921-1931. Lanham, Maryland: Scarecrow Press. ISBN 978-0810834293.
- Cahill, Thomas W., ed. (1921). Spalding's Official "Soccer" Football Guide 1921-22. Spalding's "Red Cover" Series of Athletic Handbooks, No. 55R. New York: American Sports Publishing Company.
- Cahill, Thomas W., ed. (1922). Spalding's Official "Soccer" Football Guide 1922-23. Spalding's "Red Cover" Series of Athletic Handbooks, No. 55R. New York: American Sports Publishing Company.

Footnotes
