= 1922–23 American Soccer League =

American Soccer League -1922–23 Season-
- Season: 1922–23
- Champions: J & P Coats
- Top goalscorer: Daniel McNiven (28)

Sam Mark took over the failing Fall River United at the end of the 1921-22 season and relaunched the club as the Fall River F.C. this season. Also, following the 1921-22 season, the Philadelphia F.C. club was transferred "back" to Bethlehem as the reorganized Bethlehem Steel F.C. and a new team was organized in Philadelphia to take its place.

Statistics of American Soccer League in season 1922–23.

== League standings ==
Place	Team	GP	W	D	L	GF	GA	Pts
1	J & P Coats F.C.	28	21	2	5	68	30	44
2	Bethlehem Steel F.C.	28	18	6	4	59	26	42
3	Fall River F.C.	28	15	5	8	53	36	35
4	New York S.C.	23	10	4	9	53	42	24
5	Paterson F.C.	20	9	4	7	38	31	22
6	Brooklyn Wanderers F.C.	25	5	5	15	24	52	15
7	Harrison S.C.	21	4	2	17	26	56	10
8	Philadelphia F.C.	25	3	2	20	24	72	8

== Goals leaders ==
Rank	Scorer	Club	Games	Goals
1	Daniel McNiven	Bethlehem Steel F.C.	22	28
2	Tommy Fleming	J. & P. Coats F.C.	26	22
3	Harold Brittan	Fall River F.C.	23	19
4	Frank McKenna	Paterson F.C.	14	14
5	William Shepard	J. & P. Coats F.C.	18	13
5	Johnny Reid	Fall River F.C.	26	13
7	Bart McGhee	New York S.C.	21	11
7	Archie Stark	New York S.C.	23	11
9	Tommy Duggan	Paterson F.C.	19	9
9	Percy Andrews	Philadelphia F.C.	24	9
11	William Neilson	J. & P. Coats F.C.	16	7
11	Edward McAusian	New York S.C.	16	7
13	Jimmy Easton	Bethlehem Steel F.C.	3	6
13	Davey Brown	Harrison S.C.	20	6
13	Jack Rattray	Bethlehem Steel F.C.	20	6
13	Jimmy McGhee	Philadelphia F.C.	22	6
17	Willie Crilley	New York S.C.	5	5
17	Albert Mitchell	New York S.C.	7	5
17	Charles Lappin	J. & P. Coats F.C.	16	5
17	Joseph Ingram	Harrison S.C.	20	5
