= Alec Donald =

Scottish footballer (1900–1952)

Personal information
- Full name: Alexander Donald
- Date of birth: 29 May 1900
- Place of birth: Kirkintilloch, Scotland
- Date of death: 10 April 1952 (aged 51)
- Place of death: Kirkintilloch, Scotland
- Height: 5 ft 9 in (1.75 m)
- Position: Full back

Senior career*
Years	Team	Apps	(Gls)
????–1923	Kirkintilloch Harp		
1923–1926	Partick Thistle	35	(0)
1926–1927	Indiana Flooring	39	(3)
1927–1928	Heart of Midlothian	0	(0)
1928–1930	New York Nationals	119	(2)
1930–1932	Chelsea	24	(0)
1932–1936	Bristol Rovers	136	(0)
1936–1937	Dunfermline Athletic		
- * Club domestic league appearances and goals

Alexander Donald (29 May 1900 – 10 April 1952) was a Scottish professional footballer who played in Scotland, England and the United States of America in the 1920s and 1930s.

== Career ==
Donald was born in Kirkintilloch, East Dunbartonshire in May 1900 and began his senior footballing career with his local junior league team Kirkintilloch Harp, junior in this context referring to the level of the league within Scottish football, not to the age of the participants.

He showed enough ability while playing junior league football for Partick Thistle to sign him in 1923, and after two years playing reserve football he made his début for them in the Scottish Football League First Division in 1925. He had made 35 league appearances for The Jags by the time he left the club at the end of the 1925–26 season, when he made the decision to leave Scotland and set sail for New York City. On arrival in the United States he signed for Indiana Flooring, a New York-based team who were members of the American Soccer League and who played their home games at the New York Oval.

Donald made 39 appearances for Indiana Flooring during the 1926–27 American Soccer League season, scoring three goals, helping his side to a mid-table finish in the league. At the end of the campaign he and teammate Harry Chatton both returned to Scotland, signing for Heart of Midlothian in 1927. Neither player was able to play any matches for Hearts however when Partick Thistle stepped in to cancel the move, claiming that they still retained both players' registrations.

While Donald and Chatton were back in the UK Indiana Flooring had been sold to Charles Stoneham, owner of the New York Giants baseball team (now the San Francisco Giants). He had wanted to name the soccer team the Giants to match his other franchise but as there was already a New York Giants in the league he was unable to do so, instead he opted to rename them the New York Nationals. After protracted negotiations with the Nationals, during which the American club agreed to award the pair some back payments for the period they were unable to play, Donald and Chatton returned to New York to re-join their former side. Donald stating he would never play for Partick again, and Chatton going further by saying he would never return to Scotland.

Donald made 119 appearances and scored twice for the Nationals and was on the winning side in the 1928 National Challenge Cup final, but decided to move on yet again in July 1930, this time to England to play for Chelsea. He played 24 league games in two years with Chelsea and then 136 games during a four-year spell with Bristol Rovers. Donald finally returned to Scotland in 1936 to sign for Dunfermline Athletic at the age of 38.

In the 1940s Donald moved to his home town to coach the Kirkintilloch Boys Club. He worked as a school attendance officer in the town but struggled with poor health in later years and eventually died there on 10 April 1952 after a long illness.
