= 1923–24 American Soccer League =

American Soccer League -1923–24 Season-
- Season: 1923–24
- Champions: Fall River F.C.
- Top goalscorer: Archie Stark (21)

Statistics of American Soccer League in season 1923–24.

== League standings ==
Place	Team	GP	W	D	L	GF	GA	Pts
1	Fall River F.C.	27	19	6	2	59	19	44
2	Bethlehem Steel F.C.	28	18	4	6	63	33	40
3	New York S.C.	28	15	8	5	67	39	38
4	J. & P. Coats F.C.	25	11	5	9	59	54	27
5	Brooklyn Wanderers F.C.	27	9	5	13	47	57	23
6	National Giants F.C.	26	6	6	14	36	64	18
7	Philadelphia F.C.	26	5	3	18	30	64	13
8	Newark F.C.	23	3	1	19	20	53	7

== Goals leaders ==
Rank	Scorer	Club	Games	Goals
1	Archie Stark	New York S.C.	25	21
2	Tommy Fleming	J. & P. Coats F.C.	23	20
3	Harold Brittan	Fall River F.C.	20	15
4	Tommy Duggan	New York S.C.	27	14
4	Alex Jackson	Bethlehem Steel F.C.	28	14
6	Billy Adam	J. & P. Coats F.C.	23	13
6	Daniel McNiven	National Giants F.C./New York S.C.	23	13
6	Wattie Jackson	Bethlehem Steel F.C.	23	13
9	Billy Hogg	Brooklyn Wanderers F.C.	23	12
9	Bart McGhee	New York S.C.	27	12
11	Bill McPherson	Fall River F.C.	26	10
12	Mike Cosgrove	Brooklyn Wanderers F.C.	23	9
12	Malcolm Goldie	Bethlehem Steel F.C.	27	9
14	Johnny Grainger	Bethlehem Steel F.C.	11	8
14	Dougie Campbell	Fall River F.C.	25	8
14	Johnny Reid	Fall River F.C.	26	8
14	Bob Curtis	Brooklyn Wanderers F.C.	27	8
