= John Duffy (soccer) =

American soccer player

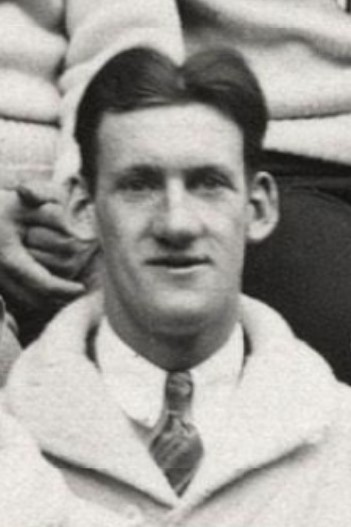
- John Duffy in 1928

Personal information
- Full name: John J. Duffy
- Date of birth: September 6, 1905
- Date of death: September 27, 1984 (aged 79)
- Place of death: Woburn, Massachusetts, United States
- Position: Fullback

Senior career*
Years	Team	Apps	(Gls)
1925–1927	Philadelphia Field Club	18	(0)
1927–1929	Newark Skeeters	4	(0)
1929–1930	New York Nationals	1	(0)
1930	New York Giants	2	(0)
1930	Brooklyn Wanderers	3	(0)
1930	New York Soccer Club	1	(0)

International career
1928	United States	2	(0)
- * Club domestic league appearances and goals

John Duffy (September 6, 1905 – September 27, 1984 in Woburn, Massachusetts) was an American soccer player who played as a full back. Duffy played five years in the American Soccer League and earned two caps with the U.S. national team in 1928.

== American Soccer League ==
In 1925, Duffy signed with the Philadelphia Field Club of the American Soccer League. He spent two seasons in Philadelphia before moving to the Newark Skeeters for the 1927–1928 season. In 1928, the Skeeters were suspended from the ASL and moved to the Eastern Professional Soccer League. In 1929, Duffy moved to the New York Nationals. In 1930, the Nationals were renamed the New York Giants. Duffy began the fall 1930 season with the Giants before playing three games with the Brooklyn Wanderers and finished the fall with one game with the New York Soccer Club.

== National team ==
Duffy earned two caps with the U.S. national team. The first came at the 1928 Summer Olympics when the U.S. lost to Argentina 11–2. Following this loss, the U.S. tied Poland, 3-3, on June 10, 1928.
