= Willie Herd =

American soccer player

Personal information
- Place of birth: Scotland
- Position: Left half

Senior career*
Years	Team	Apps	(Gls)
1919–1921	Lochgelly United		
1921–1922	New York Field Club	21	(1)
1922–1923	Paterson	18	(1)
1923–1924	New York Field Club	24	(1)
1924–1925	Indiana Flooring	34	(4)
1925–	Brooklyn Wanderers	30	(4)
–1929	New York Giants	90	(6)

International career
1925	United States	1	(0)
- * Club domestic league appearances and goals

William Herd was a soccer player who played as a left half. Born in Scotland, he earned one cap with the United States national team. He also played eight seasons in the American Soccer League.

== Professional ==
In 1919, Herd began his professional career with Lochgelly United when it was reconstituted following World War I. At the time, Lochgelly United competed in the Scottish Northern and Central Leagues. In 1921, he moved to the United States where he signed with the New York Field Club of the American Soccer League season. He moved to Paterson for the 1922–23 season. Paterson won the 1923 National Challenge Cup over St. Louis Scullin Steel. In 1923, he returned to New York F.C. When New York folded following the end of the season, Herd moved to Indiana Flooring for the 1924–25 season. In 1925, he moved to the Brooklyn Wanderers, again spending only one season with the team. In 1926, he moved to the New York Giants, and remained with the Giants until they were expelled by the ASL during the 1928–29 season. He remained with them when they moved to the Eastern Professional Soccer League.

== National team ==
Herd earned one cap with the U.S. national team in a 6–1 win over Canada on 8 November 1925.

== See also ==
- List of United States men's international soccer players born outside the United States
