= Jimmy Gallagher =

American soccer player

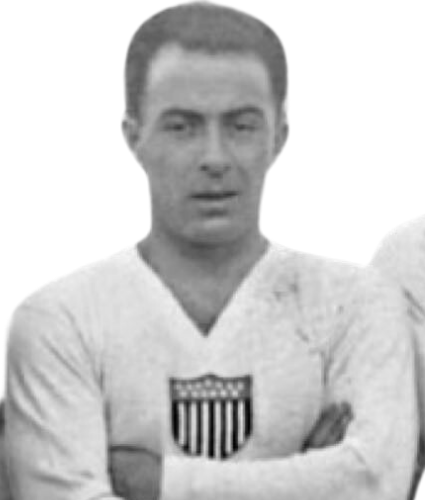
- Gallagher in 1930

Personal information
- Full name: James J. Gallagher
- Date of birth: June 7, 1901
- Place of birth: Kirkintilloch, Scotland
- Date of death: October 7, 1971 (aged 70)
- Place of death: Cleveland, Ohio, U.S.
- Height: 5 ft 10 in (1.78 m)
- Position: Midfielder

Senior career*
Years	Team	Apps	(Gls)
1919–1921	Tebo Yacht Basin		
1921–1923	J&P Coats	30	(5)
1923	Fall River F.C.	2	(1)
1924	New York Giants	13	(1)
1924–1925	Fleisher Yarn	14	(0)
1925–1927	Indiana Flooring	75	(9)
1927–1930	→ New York Nationals	144	(30)
1930–1932	→ New York Giants	68	(12)
1932–1933	New York Field Club		
1933	Malta United		
1934–193?	Cleveland Slavia		
- Cleveland Graphite Bronze

International career
1930–1934	United States	5	(0)
Medal record
Men's soccer
Representing United States
FIFA World Cup
Third place	1930 Uruguay
- * Club domestic league appearances and goals

James J. Gallagher (June 7, 1901 – October 7, 1971) was a soccer player who played as a midfielder and spent eleven seasons in the American Soccer League. Born in Scotland, he was a member of the United States national team at the 1930 FIFA World Cup and 1934 FIFA World Cup. Gallagher was inducted into the National Soccer Hall of Fame in 1986.

== Youth ==
Gallagher moved to the U.S. with his mother when he was twelve, settling in New York City. When he was seventeen, he signed with Tebo Yacht Basin F.C. of the New York State League. In 1920, Tebo lost to Brooklyn Robins Dry Dock in the third round of the National Challenge Cup. However, the team won the 1920-1921 league and league cup titles.

== Professional career ==
In 1921, Gallagher, and teammate Albert Mitchell, moved to J&P Coats of the newly formed American Soccer League (ASL), spending two seasons with the team. J&P Coats won the 1922-1923 league title but lost in the semifinals of the 1923 National Challenge Cup to eventual winner Paterson F.C.

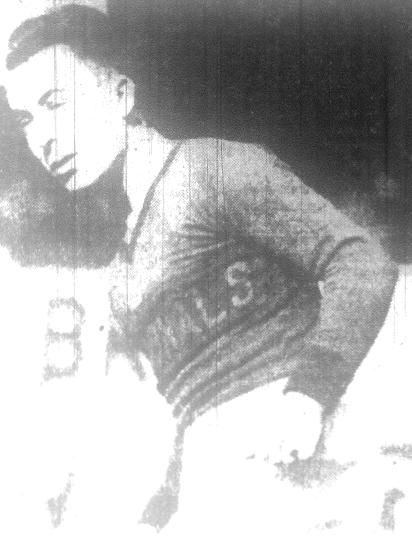
Gallagher with the New York Nationals in 1931

In 1923, Gallagher began the 1923–1924 season with Fall River F.C. but moved to the New York Giants after only two games. In the summer of 1924, he moved to Fleisher Yarn. After one season, he transferred to Indiana Flooring, a new team to the league which played in the New York City area. In 1927, Charles Stoneham, bought Indiana Flooring and changed the team's name to the New York Nationals. After three seasons under that name, Stoneham changed it again, this time to the New York Giants in 1930. However, while still using the moniker "Nationals", the team won both the ASL league and cup (Lewis Cup) titles.

As the Giants, the team won the 1931-1932 ASL championship. By that time, the league was collapsing. The Giants lasted through the spring 1932 season before folding. It appears that at that time, Gallagher moved to the New York Field Club. He then played for Malta United on Long Island through at least December 1933. He then moved west to sign with Cleveland Slavia. He remained with them through at least 1934 as he was listed with Slavia on the 1934 World Cup roster. At some point, he moved to Cleveland Graphite Bronze where he finished his career.

When Gallagher left the ASL to move to Cleveland, he had played a total of 346 regular and post season games. That was third on the U.S. list until Chris Henderson passed him in 2006.

== National team ==
Gallagher earned five caps with the United States national team. He played in all three U.S. games at the 1930 FIFA World Cup as the U.S. made it to the semifinals. He also played a friendly with Brazil following the cup. His last game with the national team came in the U.S. victory over Mexico on May 24, 1934, which qualified the U.S. for the 1934 FIFA World Cup finals. He is often confused with another Jimmy Gallagher, who played for the U.S. at the 1928 Olympics in Amsterdam.

== Personal ==
In 1937 Gallagher married Marie Coughlin. They went on to have two daughters, Rita Gallager (Weber) and Carol Gallagher (Such). He has 11 grandchildren, 23 great-grandchildren, and 5 great-great-grandchildren.

Gallagher was inducted into the National Soccer Hall of Fame in 1986.

== See also ==
- List of United States men's international soccer players born outside the United States
