= Mick Connaboy =

Scottish footballer (1901–1948)

Personal information
- Full name: Michael Connaboy
- Date of birth: 29 November 1901
- Place of birth: Edinburgh, Scotland
- Date of death: 1948 (aged 46–47)
- Height: 5 ft 10 in (1.78 m)
- Positions: Inside forward; wing half

Senior career*
Years	Team	Apps	(Gls)
19??–1922	Loanhead Mayflower		
1922–1926	Alloa Athletic		
1926–1931	Cowdenbeath		
1928–1929	New York Nationals	40	(7)
1930–1931	Yeovil & Petters United		
1931–1932	Wolverhampton Wanderers	0	(0)
1932–1933	Exeter City	4	(1)
1933–1934	Darlington	10	(0)
- * Club domestic league appearances and goals

Michael Connaboy (29 November 1901 – 1948) was a Scottish footballer who played as an inside forward or wing half. Born in Edinburgh, he played for a local junior club before joining Scottish League Division One club Alloa Athletic in 1922. He spent three-and-a-half seasons with Alloa, all but the first in Division Two, then returned to Division One for two seasons with Cowdenbeath. In 1928, he went to America where he played in the American Soccer League for the New York Nationals. On his return, he played non-league football in England for Yeovil & Petters United, spent a season with Football League Second Division club Wolverhampton Wanderers without playing for their first team, and finished up with a season in the Third Division Southern Section with Exeter City and one in the Northern Section with Darlington, playing infrequently for both. He died in 1948.

== Life and career ==
=== Early career and Alloa Athletic ===
Connaboy, who was born in Edinburgh, played football for local junior club Loanhead Mayflower, from where he signed for Scottish League Division One club Alloa Athletic in November 1922. Described as "an inside right forward of good height and build", he had previously had a trial with Dunfermline Athletic, and was rumoured in the press to have asked them for a signing-on fee of £1,000 and wages of £7 per week. The Scotsman thought him too slow in his debut match, against Clyde on 11 November, but he was to play regularly for Alloa through the 1922–23 season; his work was described as "stolid and brawny" in a 1–0 defeat at Raith Rovers, in contrast to the "nippiness" of Willie Crilley and the "cute work" of Wood. They were relegated to Division Two for 1923–24, and Connaboy showed up well at the lower level. He scored valuable goals, including a late winner against Cowdenbeath – "when everybody had got resigned to a drawn game Stirling and Connaboy, who had taken Wood's place on the right wing, darted up the wing, and after passing all opposition Connaboy when almost on the goal line sent in an oblique shot which struck the inside of the faraway upright and went into the net" – and Alloa's first two goals of a 4–2 win against St Bernard's, but Alloa still finished near the bottom of the table.

He signed on again for 1924–25, but not until the season had already begun. In October, Connaboy fell foul of the Scottish Football Association's crackdown on rough play: he was suspended for 14 days for "assuming a fighting attitude" towards an opponent. Mason was generally preferred at inside right, but in the latter part of the season, Connaboy came into the eleven at right half; by April 1925, the side with Connaboy at right half was described as full strength. In May, English First Division club Burnley made repeated enquiries after Connaboy's availability, but it was reported that the fee offered was "not large enough to satisfy either the player or the club". He lined up as usual when the new season opened, and was a regular selection, but without a fixed position. He began the season at right half, then moved to inside right, and had a long spell at inside left before returning to the right side.

=== Cowdenbeath ===
At the end of the season, Connaboy was among a number of players granted two weeks by the SFA to agree terms with their club, failing which they would be transfer-listed. Nine days later, he signed for Division One club Cowdenbeath. Over the first few months of the season, he occupied both half-back positions, and scored his first goal of the season in December from the inside-left position, in a 3–2 defeat of Falkirk in which Cowdenbeath's goalkeeper injured a shoulder and came back after treatment to partner Connaboy on the left wing and set up the winning goal. He was also one of several tried without success at centre forward. In March, Cowdenbeath fined Connaboy £3 for refusing to report on a Sunday to have an injury assessed; he took the matter to the SFA to see if the club had the right to require his attendance on a Sunday (which was a common occurrence, particularly for treatment of injuries), but his appeal was unsuccessful.

He finished the season as the regular selection at right half, and began the new one there, as one of a half-back line who were "full of running, kept their position, and passed with good judgment" as Cowdenbeath beat Dundee 1–0. His form dipped in the first half of the campaign, but had improved when he came back into the side in the new year. He scored as Cowdenbeath became the only team to take a point off Rangers at Ibrox in 1927–28, "played such an improved game, filling the gap caused by the indisposition of Leonard" in the following week's win against Hamilton Academical, and scored one of the goals as Cowdenbeath beat Johnstone 12–0 in the first round of the Scottish Cup.

=== American Soccer League ===
In the summer of 1928, Connaboy and teammate Hookey Leonard – described on the passenger list as labourer and miner respectively – embarked for the United States to play for New York Nationals in the American Soccer League. They arrived three days before the first match in the championship play-off series, against Bethlehem Steel, and were deemed eligible. Leonard scored, and Connaboy also played, prompting calls for player eligibility rules in a play-off series. Nationals lost both matches, so were eliminated. In the 1928–29 season, Connaboy was a regular in the side; he played in 40 of the 50 league matches, scoring once, and in 7 Lewis Cup matches. He returned to Scotland at the end of the season.

=== Yeovil & Petters United ===
Cowdenbeath transfer-listed Connaboy in the summer of 1930 at a fee of £1,000. He moved into English non-league football with Yeovil & Petters United, and made his debut in the London Combination Division Two 4–2 defeat at home to Thames Association; the Devon and Exeter Gazette thought he "obviously had not had time to settle down". Once he did settle, he played well. Against Plymouth Argyle reserves in the Western League at the end of October, Connaboy's "deadliness lay in his wonderful ball control and deft passes, which so often outwitted the defence. He crowned a splendid display by scoring Yeovil's fourth goal a minute or two before the final whistle went".

Perhaps he had something to prove. Some days earlier, he and three teammates had stripped 7 cwt (360 kg) of lead from the roof of a building where they had been employed to demolish a wall and sold it. According to the Gazette's report of their defence counsel's speech, "the footballers had been very silly, but they came from Scotland, and were, doubtless, unaware they were committing a serious offence", and a conviction would mean their dismissal by the Yeovil club. In recognition of their previous good character, they were bound over for six months and ordered to pay costs.

As he had done for Cowdenbeath, Connaboy scored in a 12–0 win, this time against the previously unbeaten Exeter City reserves in the Western League. He and his teammates again made the news pages when they were reported as needing to sprint to escape the attentions of a bull through whose field they were walking. As of the end of March, he had not missed a match since making his debut, and contributed eight goals to Yeovil's runners-up finish in both Western League and London Combination.

=== Later career ===
Although Yeovil offered terms to Connaboy for the 1931–32 season, and amid interest from other Football League clubs, he signed for Second Division club Wolverhampton Wanderers. As part of the deal, Wolves played a friendly match at Yeovil's ground, which they won 8–4, Connaboy scoring their fourth goal. Speculation by the Daily Express that the existing forwards would prove "difficult to displace" proved accurate. He never played for Wolves' first team, and signed for Exeter City of the Third Division South after just one season. He played in Exeter's first four league matches – their first goal of the season came when Bristol City's goalkeeper was shoulder-charged over the line after collecting Connaboy's shot, and he scored in their second match, a 5–3 defeat to Northampton Town – but was dropped in favour of Jack Kennedy and never regained his first-team place.

He spent the 1933–34 season with Darlington, for whom he made ten appearances in the Third Division North, mainly as back-up to Dan Cassidy at right half, and played for the club's reserve team in the North-Eastern League. In October 1935, he was reported to have signed for Scottish Second Division club Brechin City and to be in their team for the coming match, but he did not appear.

Connaboy died in 1948.
