= Henry Meyerdierks =

American soccer player

Personal information
- Full name: Henry Meyerdierks
- Place of birth: New York City, United States
- Positions: Outside forward; wing half

Senior career*
Years	Team	Apps	(Gls)
1915–1916	Continentals		
1918–1919	Paterson		
1921–1924	New York Field Club	54	(3)
1924–1927	New York Giants	45	(0)

International career
1925	United States	1	(0)
- * Club domestic league appearances and goals

Henry Meyerdierks was an American soccer wing half who played six seasons in the first American Soccer League and earned one cap with the U.S. national team. He was born in New York City, New York.

== Professional career ==
Meyerdierks played for Continentals F.C. during the 1915–1916 season. In 1919, he played for Paterson F.C. of the National Association Football League in the 1919 National Challenge Cup final. In 1921, Meyerdierks signed with the New York Field Club of the American Soccer League. He played three seasons with them before transferring to the New York Giants in 1924. He saw time in thirty-three games during the 1924–1925 season, but only three and nine games in the next two seasons. He left the Giants at the end of the 1926–1927 season.

== National team ==
Meyerdierks earned his lone cap in a 1–0 loss to Canada on June 27, 1925.

== Spelling of last name ==
While this article uses the National Soccer Hall of Fame spelling of Meyerdierks last name, other sources have different versions. A June 13, 1925 newspaper article lists it as Meyerdeicks, and Colin Jose, in his book on the American Soccer League, spells it as Meyerdirks.
