= Tommy Stark =

American soccer player (1895–1964)

Personal information
- Full name: Thomas Walter Stark
- Date of birth: January 8, 1895
- Place of birth: Glasgow, Scotland
- Date of death: February 14, 1964 (aged 69)
- Place of death: Colorado Springs, United States
- Position: Left back

Senior career*
Years	Team	Apps	(Gls)
1914–1915	Kearny Scots		
1918–1919	Paterson F.C.		
1919–1921	Erie A.A.		
1921–1924	New York Field Club	57	(4)
1924	New York Giants	2	(1)
1924–1925	Newark Skeeters	8	(1)

International career
1925	United States	1	(0)
- * Club domestic league appearances and goals

Thomas Walter Stark (January 8, 1895 – February 14, 1964) was a soccer player who played as a right half. He spent several seasons in both the National Association Football League and the first American Soccer League. Born in Scotland, Stark earned one cap for the United States national team in 1925.

== Professional career ==
Stark, brother of Hall of Fame member Archie Stark, was part of the Kearny Scots team which won the 1915 American Cup. He also played with Paterson F.C. of the National Association Football League (NAFBL) during the 1918–1919 season. That year Paterson lost the 1919 National Challenge Cup final to Bethlehem Steel He was then with Erie A.A. during the 1920-1921 NAFBL season. In 1921, the American Soccer League replaced the NAFBL and Stark moved to New York Field Club. In 1924, he moved to the New York Giants, but played only two games before transferring to the Newark Skeeters. He left the Skeeters and the league after only eight games.

== National team ==
Stark earned one cap with the U.S. national team in a 1–0 loss to Canada on June 27, 1925.

== See also ==
- List of United States men's international soccer players born outside the United States
