= Tommy McFarlane =

American soccer player

Personal information
- Place of birth: Scotland
- Place of death: United States
- Position: Center half

Senior career*
| Years | Team | Apps | (Gls) |
- Partick Thistle
| 1921–1922 | Fall River United | 8 | (1) |
| 1922–1924 | Bethlehem Steel | 28 | (2) |
| 1924–1925 | Indiana Flooring | 18 | (1) |
| 1925 | Sayles | | |
| 1925–1927 | J&P Coats | 17 | (1) |

International career
| 1925 | United States | 1 | (0) |
- * Club domestic league appearances and goals

Tommy McFarlane was a soccer player who played as a center half who began his career in Scotland before moving to the United States. Born in Scotland, he earned one cap for the United States national team in 1925.

== Club career ==
McFarlane began his career with Partick Thistle of the Scottish Football League. In 1921, he moved to the United States where he signed with the Fall River United of the American Soccer League. After one season, he moved to the Bethlehem Steel. While he began the 1924–1925 season with Bethlehem, he moved to J&P Coats after only four games. McFarlane played eighteen games with J&P Coats, but was listed in June 1925 with amateur club Sayles. That fall, McFarlane signed with J&P Coats and played with them through the end of the 1926–1927 season.

== National team ==
McFarlane earned one cap with the U.S. national team in a 1–0 loss to Canada on June 27, 1925.

== See also ==
- List of United States men's international soccer players born outside the United States
