= Jimmy Douglas (American soccer) =

American soccer player (1898–1972)

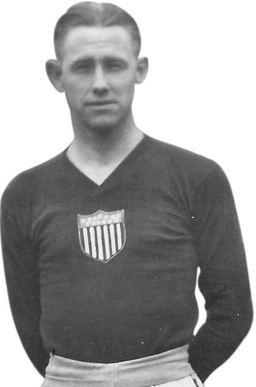
- Douglas with the U.S. national team

Personal information
- Full name: James Edward Douglas
- Date of birth: January 12, 1898
- Place of birth: East Newark, New Jersey, U.S.
- Date of death: March 5, 1972 (aged 74)
- Place of death: Point Pleasant, New Jersey, U.S.
- Height: 6 ft 1 in (1.86 m)
- Position: Goalkeeper

Youth career
- 1907–: Central Juniors
- Ryerson
- Antlers
- Erie
- Swanson

Senior career*
Years	Team	Apps	(Gls)
1922–1923	Harrison S.C.	14	(0)
1923–1925	Newark Skeeters	43	(0)
1925–1927	New York Giants	40	(0)
1927–1928	Fall River F.C.	29	(0)
1928	Philadelphia Field Club	12	(0)
1928–1929	Brooklyn Wanderers	3	(0)
1929	Fall River F.C.	10	(0)
1929–1930	New York Nationals	13	(0)
1930	→ New York Giants	24	(0)
1931	New York Americans	7	(0)
Total		195	(0)

International career
1924–1930	United States	9	(0)
Medal record
Men's soccer
Representing United States
FIFA World Cup
Third place	1930 Uruguay
- * Club domestic league appearances and goals

Jimmy Douglas (January 12, 1898 – March 5, 1972) was an American soccer goalkeeper who spent his career in the first American Soccer League (ASL). He earned nine caps with the United States national team, making his first appearance at the 1924 Summer Olympics. He finished his international career at the 1930 FIFA World Cup, where he posted the first "clean sheet" in World Cup history. Douglas was inducted into the National Soccer Hall of Fame in 1953.

== Playing career ==
Douglas began his organized playing career with the youth club, Central Juniors of Newark, New Jersey in 1907 when he was nine years old. Over the next fourteen years he played for a variety of amateur teams including Ryerson, Antlers, Erie and Swansons. In 1922, he signed with Harrison S.C. of the American Soccer League (ASL). However, he remained an amateur, refusing to accept any payment. In the 1922–1923 ASL season, Douglas played twenty-three games, winning fourteen and gaining a 2.44 goals against average (GAA). In 1923, he moved to the Newark Skeeters (at times called Newark F.C.). Douglas spent two seasons with Newark, still maintaining his amateur status. In the fall of 1925, Douglas began playing for the New York Giants. However, the Newark Skeeters still listed Douglas on their rosters and the Giants were forced to forfeit several games after teams complained to the league. After the Giants resolved that issue, Douglas continued to play for them until October 1927 when he moved to the Fall River F.C. After one season with Fall River, Douglas joined the Philadelphia Field Club during the 1928–1929 season, playing twelve games before transferring to the Brooklyn Wanderers for three games. He eventually finished the season back with Fall River F.C. In 1929, Douglas signed with the New York Nationals. In 1930, Charles Stoneham, owner of the Nationals, renamed his team the New York Giants when the original Giants changed their name to New York Soccer Club. Douglas continued with the new Giants through the 1930 spring and fall season before moving to the New York Americans in 1931. He played only seven games before retiring from professional soccer.

== National team ==
Douglas earned nine caps with the U.S. men's national team between 1924 and 1930. His first game was during the 1924 Summer Olympics. He backstopped the U.S. to a 1–0 victory over Estonia on May 25, 1924; Douglas was named the game's MVP. Then four days later, the U.S. lost to Uruguay 3–0, which put the U.S. out of the tournament. Douglas then played the next two 1924 U.S. games. In 1925, he played during a U.S. 1–0 shutout of Canada in Montreal. In 1930, he returned to the national team for the 1930 FIFA World Cup. Douglas shutout Belgium and Paraguay before losing to Argentina in the semifinals. About four minutes into that game, Douglas twisted his knee, then two U.S. players were injured. As the rules did not allow substitutes at the time, Douglas and his teammates were forced to play injured. Following the World Cup, the U.S. traveled to Rio de Janeiro where they lost 4–3 to Brazil. Douglas finished his U.S. career with four wins and three shutouts.

The National Soccer Hall of Fame inducted Douglas in 1954. Douglas died on March 5, 1972, in Point Pleasant, New Jersey.
