= Robert Millar (soccer) =

American soccer player and coach

Bob Millar
Personal information
- Full name: Robert Millar
- Date of birth: May 12, 1889
- Place of birth: Paisley, Scotland
- Date of death: February 26, 1967 (aged 76)
- Place of death: Staten Island, New York, U.S.
- Position: Inside left

Senior career*
Years	Team	Apps	(Gls)
1909–1911	St Mirren		
1912–1913	Disston A.A.		
1913–1914	Brooklyn Field Club		
1914–1916	Bethlehem Steel		
1916–1918	Babcock & Wilcox		
1916	→ N.Y. Clan MacDonald (loan)		
1916	→ Hibernian F.C. (loan)		
1916	→ Allentown (loan)		
1918–1919	Bethlehem Steel	5	(1)
1919–1920	Robins Dry Dock		
1920	J&P Coats		
1920–1921	Erie A.A.		
1921	→ Tebo Yacht Basin (loan)		
1921–1922	J&P Coats	21	(10)
1922–1923	Fall River F.C.	6	(3)
1923	New York Field Club	5	(0)
1923–1925	New York Giants	42	(11)
1925–1927	Indiana Flooring	57	(29)
1927–1928	→ New York Nationals	22	(2)
1928–1929	New York Giants	13	(4)

International career
1925	United States	2	(0)

Managerial career
- 1925–1927: Indiana Flooring
- 1927–1928: → New York Nationals
- 1929: Newark Skeeters
- 1928–1930: United States
Medal record
Representing United States
Soccer
FIFA World Cup
Bronze medal – third place	1930 Uruguay	Soccer
- * Club domestic league appearances and goals

Robert Millar (May 12, 1890 – February 22, 1967) was a Scottish professional soccer player who played as a forward and the coach of the United States national team at the 1930 FIFA World Cup. During his at times tumultuous Hall of Fame career, he played with over a dozen teams in at least five U.S. leagues as well as two seasons in the Scottish Football League. He finished his career as a successful professional and national team coach.

== Playing ==
=== Professional ===
In 1909, Millar began his professional career with St Mirren of the Scottish Football League. He left St Mirren in 1911 to move to the United States, joining Disston A.A. during the 1912–1913 season. In 1913, he moved to the Brooklyn Field Club of the National Association Football League (NAFBL). In January 1914, Brooklyn played Disston in the quarterfinals of the 1914 American Cup. During the game, Millar was involved in a fight with a Disston fan on the sidelines which resulted in a brawl between fans and players from both teams. Later that year, Brooklyn won the inaugural National Challenge Cup over Brooklyn Celtic, with Millar assisting on the winning goal. This victory made Brooklyn the first team to win what could become known as the U.S. Open Cup.

In September 1914, Millar moved to Bethlehem Steel for the 1914–1915 Allied League of Philadelphia season. That season, he scored fifty-nine goals in thirty-three league and cup games, setting a U.S. record. The season culminated with Bethlehem winning the 1915 National Challenge Cup, 3–1 over Brooklyn Celtic. Millar scored Bethlehem's first goal.

In early 1916, Millar signed with Babcock & Wilcox of the NAFBL, but played on loan to both Philadelphia Hibernian and Allentown. In February 1916, Millar signed with New York Clan MacDonald for New York State Cup games, Philadelphia Hibernian for league games and St. George F.C. of the New York State Association Football League. At some point, Millar may have played for a team in the St. Louis Soccer League as a December 27, 1918 newspaper article mentions his return from playing there. In December 1918, Millar rejoined Bethlehem Steel, but left seven months later to sign with Robins Dry Dock for the 1919–1920 season. However, he had significant disagreements with his teammates and left Robins some time in the spring of 1920 to join J&P Coats of the Southern New England Soccer League. He then moved to Erie A.A. for the 1920–1921 season.

In January 1921, he was suspended for two months after striking former Robins teammate Neil Clarke during the halftime of Erie's National Challenge Cup loss to Robins. Since Millar was unable to play for the remainder of the NAFBL season, Erie loaned him to Tebo Yacht Basin F.C. In May, Millar met up with Robins when Tebo defeated Dry Dock in the New York State Cup. Ironically, Robins Dry Dock and Tebo Yacht Basin were both subsidiary companies of Todd Shipyards. Millar rejoined J&P Coats for the first season, 1921–1922, of the recently established American Soccer League.

In 1922, Millar left Coats and signed with the Fall River F.C., but the team released him in January 1923, after he played only six games. He joined New York Field Club, for the remainder of the season, as well as the 1923–1924 season. However, he again did not complete the season with New York, but moved to the New York Giants. In August 1925, Millar signed with Indiana Flooring as a player and coach. In 1927, Charles Stoneham purchased Flooring and renamed the team the New York Nationals. Millar continue to coach and play for the Nationals until the onset of the 1928 Soccer Wars. In that internecine conflict, the United States Football Association declared the American Soccer League an "outlaw league".

In October 1928, Millar resigned from the Nationals, informing the team management, ""I hereby advise you that I must refuse to continue as playing manager of the New York Nationals Football Club. I hereby tender my resignation, because to engage further in unsanctioned soccer football will materially endanger my status in organized soccer and will thereby affect my future livelihood as a professional soccer player. You have not lived up to the terms of my contract, which call for me to play and manage under the rules and regulations of the United States Football Association, and by forcing me to engage in outlaw soccer, you are breaking my means of gaining a living. I am compelled to seek a position in organized football." He then jumped to the New York Giants who had been expelled from the ASL as part of the "Soccer War". The USFA then brokered the creation of the Eastern Soccer League as a home for ASL teams which wanted to regain their status as "official" FIFA teams. He remained with the Giants until they returned to the ASL in 1929.

=== National team ===
In 1925 Millar was called into the U.S. national team for two games with Canada. Canada won the first game, 1–0, on June 27, 1925. The U.S. won the return game, 6–1, on November 11, 1925. This game was tied 1–1 at halftime, but Millar assisted on the second U.S. game, scored by Archie Stark soon after halftime.

== Coaching ==
=== Club ===
Millar began his coaching career when he was hired by Indiana Flooring in 1925 as both a player and a coach. He remained with Flooring as coach through its 1927 name change to the New York Nationals, but resigned in October 1928 during the soccer wars. He later coached the Newark Skeeters in 1929.

=== National team ===
Millar was selected as the coach of the U.S. national team for the 1930 FIFA World Cup. The success of the national side at the first World Cup in finishing as semi-finalists came as a surprise, more so since they won both of their group matches (against Belgium and Paraguay) without conceding a goal. In the semi-final they suffered considerable ill-luck, two players being injured during the game against Argentina. Following their elimination from the cup, the U.S. played a series of exhibition games against South American professional and regional All Star teams. Of those games, a 4–3 loss to Brazil was the only official international game. Millar finished his term as national team coach with a 2–2 record.

Millar was inducted into the U.S. Soccer Hall of Fame in 1950.

== Personal life ==
Millar has a daughter, Mary Martin, who lives in Gresham, Oregon.

== Honors ==
St Mirren

- Paisley Charity Cup: 1910
- Renfrewshire Cup: 1910

Tacony FC

- Pennsylvania League: 1912

Brooklyn Field

- National Challenge Cup: 1914

Bethlehem Steel

- National Challenge Cup: 1915, 1919

Robin Dry Dock

- American Cup: 1920

New York Nationals (player / coach)

- National Challenge Cup: 1928

United States (coach)

- FIFA World Cup: Bronze-medal 1930

Individual

- National Soccer Hall of Fame:

== Sources ==
- Jose, Colin (1998). American Soccer League, 1921–1931 (Hardback). The Scarecrow Press. ISBN 0-8108-3429-4. ().

== See also ==
- List of United States men's international soccer players born outside the United States
