= Willie Crilley =

American soccer player (1901–1955)

Personal information
- Full name: William Alphonsus Crilley
- Date of birth: 29 August 1901
- Place of birth: Cowcaddens, Scotland
- Date of death: 16 September 1955 (aged 54)
- Place of death: New York City, New York, U.S.
- Position: Forward

Youth career
- Pale Ale

Senior career*
Years	Team	Apps	(Gls)
1920–1921	Cambuslang Rangers		
1920–1922	Alloa Athletic		
1922–1923	Celtic	3	(1)
1923	Alloa Athletic		
1923	New York Field Club	7	(5)
1923–1924	New York Giants	2	(1)
1924	Alloa Athletic		
1924–1925	Indiana Flooring	11	(4)
1925–1926	New York Giants	31	(6)
1927	J&P Coats	9	(3)
1927	Philadelphia Field Club	2	(1)
1927	New York Nationals	4	(0)
1928	Brooklyn Hispano	22	(17)
1929	New York Hungaria	6	(1)
1929	IRT Rangers	3	(0)
1930	Newark Americans	2	(2)
1930	New York Soccer Club	1	(0)
1931	Fall River	5	(0)
1931	Brooklyn Wanderers	7	(14)
1931	New York American	10	(9)
1935	Brooklyn Hispano		
- * Club domestic league appearances and goals

William Alphonsus Crilley (29 August 1901 – 16 September 1955) was a Scottish-American football forward who holds the record for the greatest number of goals scored by an Alloa Athletic player in a single season of the Scottish Football League. He had an itinerant career, spending most of it in the United States with a few seasons, or parts of seasons in Scotland.

== Career ==
During his youth, Crilley played for Pale Ale, a local Glasgow amateur team. In 1920, he began the season with Cambuslang Rangers. During the season, he moved to Alloa Athletic of the Scottish Football League Second Division. In his first season with Alloa, he scored the game winners in Alloa's first and second round victories in the Scottish Cup. He also scored in the third round replay with Rangers F.C., a 4–1 loss for Alloa. Despite the loss in the Scottish Cup, Alloa won the 1921 Penman Trophy and Stirlingshire Cup. The next year, Crilley carried Alloa to the Second Division championship as he scored a record forty-nine goals, an amazing feat for a five-foot three center forward. Alloa transferred Crilley to Celtic at the end of the season, but he played only three first team games, scoring a single goal. Celtic sent him back to Alloa at the end of the season, but injuries hindered his playing time.

He then left Scotland to sign with New York Field Club in the American Soccer League which had not yet finished its season. He played five games, scoring five goals. Crilley began the 1923–1924 season in New York, played two league games, one National Challenge Cup game before being transferred to the New York Giants. He played two games, scoring one goal, then returned to Scotland to rejoin Alloa. According to the Alloa history, he was "transferred down south for £1,250" but it does not identify Crilley's new team. However, at some point he returned to the United States where he played eleven games of the 1924–1925 season with Indiana Flooring.

Crilley returned to the Giants for the 1925–1926 season, seeing his greatest number of games during any stint with a US team, twenty-eight. By this time, he was no longer a centre forward and had become better known as a top winger and an excellent play maker. Crilley resumed his nomadic career during the 1926–1927 season, bouncing between three teams during the course of the season. He began with the Giants, played nine games for J&P Coats and finished with two games at Philadelphia Field Club. He then played for the New York Nationals in 1927–1928. In the 1928–1929 season, he was with Brooklyn Hispano, New York Hungaria and the IRT Rangers of the Eastern Professional Soccer League.

He apparently returned to Scotland intending to play for Alloa Athletic, but was deported from Scotland because he had become a US citizen. Therefore, he was back into the ASL in the fall of 1930 with the Newark Americans and the New York Soccer Club. While he played only one league game with New York SC, he saw another five cup games in which he scored seven goals. He continued his itinerant ways in 1931, playing for both the Fall River and the Brooklyn Wanderers before joining the New York American in the fall of 1931. Crilley replicated his early career goal scoring heroics for these last two teams, scoring 14 goals in 7 games for Brooklyn and 9 goals in 10 games for the Americans. In 1932, he attempted to rejoin Alloa Athletic, but was rebuffed. In 1935, he played for Brooklyn Hispano in the second American Soccer League.

He returned to the United States and joined the United States Army on 18 November 1942, serving in the Air Corps with Fifteenth Air Force during World War II.
