= Tommy Robb (footballer) =

Scottish footballer

Personal information
- Date of birth: 1899
- Height: 5 ft 7 1/2 in (1.71 m)
- Position: Half back

Senior career*
Years	Team	Apps	(Gls)
- Kirkintilloch Harp
1919–1921	Bradford City	11	(1)
- Bathgate
- Hamilton Academical
- New York Giants
- * Club domestic league appearances and goals

Thomas Robb (born 1899) was a Scottish professional footballer who played as a half back.

== Career ==
Robb began his career with Kirkintilloch Harp, and joined Bradford City in December 1919. He made 11 league and 1 FA Cup appearances for the club, before moving to Bathgate in August 1921. He later played for Hamilton Academical and New York Giants.

== Sources ==
- Frost, Terry (1988). Bradford City A Complete Record 1903-1988. Breedon Books Sport. ISBN 0-907969-38-0.
