= 1921–22 American Soccer League =

American Soccer League -1921–22 Season-
- Season: 1921–22
- Teams: 8
- Champions: Philadelphia F.C.
- Top goalscorer: Harold Brittan (24)

The 1921–22 American Soccer League season was the inaugural season of the American Soccer League. Philadelphia F.C. finished on top of the season table.

== History ==
By 1921, professionalism among American soccer teams was on the rise. This created a disparity between fully professional, semi-professional and amateur teams competing in the same league. As a result, several fully professional teams in both the National Association Football League and Southern New England Soccer League joined to form the American Soccer League. The new league was geographically limited to the area between Philadelphia and Boston. On May 7, 1921, the ASL was founded at a meeting in New York by a group of investors and representatives from eight teams. W. Luther Lewis was selected as the league's first president and he established the league headquarters at 126 Nassau Street, New York. The league received approval from the United States Football Federation at its May 27, 1921, meeting and began its inaugural season in September. Celtic F.C., aka the Jersey City Celtics, folded five games into the season and the Philadelphia F.C. won the league title.

== League standings ==
Place	Team	GP	W	D	L	GF	GA	Pts
1	Philadelphia F.C.	24	17	4	3	72	36	38
2	New York F.C.	24	14	5	5	59	33	33
3	Todd Shipyards F.C.	24	12	5	7	56	37	29
4	Harrison S.C.	24	8	7	8	45	44	23
5	J. & P. Coats F.C.	23	9	5	9	34	40	23
6	Fall River United	24	5	1	18	28	57	11
7	Falco F.C.	22	2	3	17	17	64	7
n/a (Note: Games played against Celtic F.C. were removed from the standings and the team was removed from the official league standings.)	Celtic F.C. (Note: Celtic F.C. folded after five games.)	5	0	0	5	5	24	0

== Goals leaders ==
Rank	Scorer	Club	Games	Goals
1	Harold Brittan	Philadelphia F.C.	17	24
2	John Heminsley	Harrison S.C.	22	16
3	Tommy Fleming	Philadelphia F.C.	24	15
4	Frank McKenna	Todd Shipyards F.C.	20	15
5	Archie Stark	New York F.C.	21	13
6	Johnny McGuire	Todd Shipyards F.C.	20	10
7	Bob Millar	J. & P. Coats F.C.	21	10
8	P. Hardy	New York F.C.	20	9
9	Dougie Campbell	Philadelphia F.C.	24	9
10	Andrew Burnett	New York F.C.	13	8
11	Tommy Duggan	New York F.C.	24	8
11	J. Downie	Falco F.C.	20	7
11	Charles Lappin	J. & P. Coats F.C.	20	7
11	George McKelvey	Todd Shipyards F.C.	20	7
