= Tommy Duggan =

American soccer player

Personal information
- Full name: Thomas Duggan
- Date of birth: 31 August 1897
- Place of birth: Liverpool, England
- Date of death: 30 November 1961 (aged 64)
- Place of death: Kearny, New Jersey, USA
- Position: Outside right

Senior career*
Years	Team	Apps	(Gls)
- Valley Boys
1916	Babcock & Wilcox		
1918	West Hudson A.A.		
- Philadelphia Merchant Ship
1921–1922	New York Field Club	24	(8)
1922–1923	Paterson F.C.	19	(9)
1923–1924	New York Field Club	27	(14)
1924–1925	Indiana Flooring	16	(3)
1925–1926	New York Giants	45	(12)
1926–1927	Newark Skeeters	16	(5)
1927	New York Nationals	2	(0)
1927–1928	Newark Skeeters	18	(3)
1929–1930	New York Giants	5	(0)
- Newark Portuguese
- * Club domestic league appearances and goals

Tommy Duggan (31 August 1897 – 30 November 1961) was an American soccer outside right who played in both the National Association Football League and American Soccer League. He is a member of the National Soccer Hall of Fame.

Much of Duggan's early career is unknown. He moved to the United States in 1911. The first team he is recorded as playing with is the Valley Boys, of an unknown league, in 1914. He then played for Babcock & Wilcox, West Hudson A.A. and Philadelphia Merchant Ship, all of the National Association Football League (NAFBL). He was with Babcock & Wilcox in December 1916. In March 1918, he was with West Hudson A.A. In 1921, the American Soccer League replaced the NAFBL. Duggan signed with the New York Field Club of the ASL and spent one season with them before bouncing from one team to another. He was with the Paterson F.C. in the 1922–1923 season, winning the 1923 National Challenge Cup, but was back with New York F.C. the next season. In 1924, the New York F.C. was sold to new ownership, who renamed it Indiana Flooring. While Duggan began the season with Indiana, he moved to the New York Giants sixteen games into the season. Duggan spent several seasons with the Giants before leaving three games into the 1926–1927 season. He moved to the Newark Skeeters before moving to the New York Nationals for the start of the 1927–1928 season, but was back in Newark after only two games. He then played the 1929–1930 season with the New York Giants. According to the National Soccer Hall of Fame, he also played for Newark Portuguese.

Duggan was inducted into the National Soccer Hall of Fame in 1955.
