= Peter McKinney =

English footballer

Personal information
- Date of birth: 16 December 1897
- Place of birth: Leadgate, County Durham, England
- Date of death: 23 December 1979 (aged 82)
- Place of death: New York, New York, USA
- Height: 5 ft 8 1/2 in (1.74 m)
- Position: Wing half

Senior career*
Years	Team	Apps	(Gls)
- Consett Celtic
1920–1921	Liverpool	3	(1)
1923–1930	New York Giants	120	(8)
- * Club domestic league appearances and goals

Peter McKinney (16 December 1897 – 23 December 1979) was an early-twentieth-century English footballer who played professionally as a wing half in England and the United States.

McKinney played for Consett Celtic early in his career. He was signed by Liverpool where he played three games, scoring one goal, during the 1920–21 season. His first game came in October, the second in April and the third in Liverpool's last game of the season. At some point, he moved to the United States and in 1923, he signed with the New York Giants of the American Soccer League. He played for the Giants until the 1929–30 season. During the 1928–29 season, the Giants were expelled from the ASL as part of the "Soccer Wars" between the ASL and the United States Football Federation. They finished the season in the Eastern Soccer League before returning to the ASL in 1929.
