= Daniel McNiven =

Scottish footballer

Personal information
- Full name: Daniel McNiven
- Date of birth: 1902
- Place of birth: Carmunnnock, Scotland
- Position: Center forward

Senior career*
Years	Team	Apps	(Gls)
1921–1922	Partick Thistle	5	(1)
1922–1923	Bethlehem Steel	22	(28)
1923–1924	New York Field Club	19	(11)
1924	New York Giants	4	(2)
1924	Indiana Flooring	7	(1)
Total		57	(43)
- * Club domestic league appearances and goals

Daniel "Big Dan" McNiven was a Scottish football center forward who led the American Soccer League in scoring in 1922-1923.

McNiven began his professional career in 1921 with Partick Thistle of the Scottish Football League. He played only five games before leaving Scotland for the United States. Upon reaching the U.S., he signed with Bethlehem Steel of the American Soccer League. He promptly made his mark, scoring twenty-eight goals in twenty-two league games, taking the league scoring title. He also added another four goals in three league cup games. In 1923, he began the season with New York Field Club, maintaining his scoring pace with eleven goals in nineteen league games and another goal in two league cup games. However, he finished the season with the New York Giants. In 1924, he moved to Indiana Flooring, but his career ended seven games into the season when he was arrested on charges of bigamy and adultery. According to the charges, McNiven had married the wife of William Sheridan, the Bethlehem Steel coach in October 1923. In 1924, Sheridan's wife left the U.S. after having him served with divorce papers. At that point, he investigated her, discovering she had married McNiven a year prior and had McNiven arrested. That ended McNiven's football career.
