= Archie Stark =

American soccer player

Personal information
- Full name: Archibald McPherson Stark
- Date of birth: December 21, 1897
- Place of birth: Glasgow, Scotland
- Date of death: May 27, 1985 (aged 87)
- Place of death: Kearny, New Jersey, U.S.
- Position: Forward

Youth career
- 1911–1912: West Hudson Junior

Senior career*
Years	Team	Apps	(Gls)
1912–1916	Kearny Scots		
1916–1917	Babcock & Wilcox		
1917	West Hudson		
1919	Paterson F.C.		
1919–1921	Erie A.A.		
1921–1924	New York Field Club	69	(45)
1924–1930	Bethlehem Steel	221	(240)
1930	→ Fall River F.C. (guest)		
1930–1932	Newark Americans	42	(18)
1932–1933	Brooklyn Wanderers		
1933–1934	Kearny Irish	25	(22)

International career
1925	United States	2	(5)
- * Club domestic league appearances and goals

Archibald McPherson Stark (December 21, 1897 – May 27, 1985) was a Scottish American soccer player who became the dominant player in U.S. leagues during the 1920s and early 1930s. He spent nine seasons in the National Association Football League and another twelve in the American Soccer League. He also earned two caps, scoring five goals, as a member of the U.S. national team. He holds the U.S. single-season scoring record with 67 goals (including eight hat-tricks) scored during the 1924–25 season which is the current World Record. He was inducted into the National Soccer Hall of Fame in 1950.

== Club career ==
=== Youth and early career ===
Although Stark and his brother Tommy Stark were born in Scotland, they moved to the United States when Archie was thirteen years old. His family settled in Hudson County, New Jersey, where Stark immediately began his organized soccer career with the West Hudson Juniors. For a player who made his name as a forward, Stark began as a defender with the Juniors. Stark turned professional a year later when he signed with the Scottish-Americans of the National Association Football League for the 1912–1913 season. At the time, he was only fourteen. He remained with the Scottish-Americans for four seasons.

In 1915, the Scottish-Americans won the 1915 American Cup, defeating Brooklyn Celtic 1–0 on a Stark goal. The next season, the team lost the AFA championship game when Bethlehem Steel F.C. crushed them 3–0. At the end of the 1915–1916 season, Stark moved to the Bayonne, New Jersey–based Babcock & Wilcox club.

In 1917, the U.S. entered World War I, and Stark joined the U.S. Army, which briefly interrupting his career. During the war, Stark served in France.

=== Post-war resurgence ===
When he returned to the U.S. in 1919, he joined Paterson F.C., which went to the 1919 National Challenge Cup final, losing to Bethlehem Steel 2–0. Following the cup, Stark joined Bethlehem for the team's August 10, 1919, to September 24, 1919, tour of Sweden and Denmark. On that tour, Bethlehem went 6–2–6 (W-L-T). Stark then moved to Kearny, New Jersey, club Erie A.A. of the NAFBL. In a controversial decision, league officials awarded Erie A.A. the title even though Bethlehem Steel had one more point. Bethlehem Steel appealed to the U.S. Soccer Football Association, which reversed the decision. Stark remained with Erie A.A., now known as Harrison Erie S.C., through the end of the 1920–1921 season, but when several teams defected to form a new league, to be known as the American Soccer League (ASL), the NAFBL folded. Stark then jumped to the New York Field Club of the ASL in 1921. By this time he had gained a reputation as a prolific scorer and was sought after by several teams. In three seasons with New York F.C., Stark scored forty-five goals in sixty-nine games. In his last season with the team, he bagged nearly a goal a game when he scored twenty-one in twenty-five games.

=== Bethlehem Steel ===
In the off-season after the 1923–24 season, the New York F.C. franchise was sold to the Indiana Flooring Company and Stark was among the players who went with the franchise. Indiana Flooring waived Stark and Bethlehem Steel F.C. picked him up just before the new season. Stark's move to Bethlehem would gain him his recognition, as Bethlehem moved him to center forward from the right wing position he had played with New York. Bethlehem had some of the deepest pockets in the ASL and used that money to sign several top Scottish internationals.

Surrounded by talent, Stark responded by scoring 67 goals in 44 games in his first season with the team, including eight hat-tricks, which is the correct World Record for an individual. He also scored three more goals in two league cup games. The next season, Stark earned his first title with Bethlehem as the team took the 1926 National Challenge Cup. Bethlehem rolled over Ben Millers by a score of 7–2, Stark scoring three of the goals. Bethlehem went on to take the 1926–1927 ASL title, then the 1928–1929 and fall 1929 Eastern Soccer League titles.

In what became known as the Soccer War, FIFA declared the ASL an “outlaw league” in 1927. Reasons for this centered on a dispute between the ASL and the U.S. Football Association (USFA), which was backed by FIFA, about control of the sport in the United States. FIFA and USFA demanded that all ASL teams enter the National Challenge Cup (now the US Open Cup). The ASL refused to force its teams to do so, and FIFA labeled the ASL an “outlaw league”.

The ASL, U.S. federal law on its side, announced it would no longer abide by FIFA rules and would boycott FIFA events, including the National Challenge Cup. The ASL, as one of the most competitive and highest paying leagues in the world at the time, expected that many prominent international players would continue to flock to the ASL in defiance of FIFA. In order to reduce the prominence of the ASL, USFA organized a rival league, the Eastern Soccer League, in October 1928. Bethlehem Steel, in defiance of the ASL, had elected to enter the National Challenge Cup and was suspended by the league seven games into the 1928–1929 season, leading Bethlehem to join the ESL. Stark and Bethlehem Steel remained in the ESL for two seasons before returning to the ASL for the team's final season. Neither Bethlehem Steel FC nor the ASL could withstand the financial strains imposed by this situation and the Soccer War led to the demise of the ASL and Bethlehem Steel. When Bethlehem Steel folded in 1930, Stark joined the Fall River F.C. of a tour of Europe. However, the team faced financial difficulties and left the players stranded in Budapest, after which they returned to the U.S. as third class passengers.

=== Newark Americans and Kearny Irish ===
When Bethlehem Steel folded in 1930, Stark moved to the Newark Americans for the 1930–1931 ASL season. He remained with the Americans through the demise of the ASL in 1933. However, the statistics for the last two ASL seasons have been lost and we no longer know how many goals Stark scored during them.

After the first ASL finally collapsed in 1933, Stark ended up with Kearny Irish, which joined the new American Soccer League (ASL II) for the league's inaugural 1933–1934 season. The Irish took the league title, and Stark shared the scoring title with Razzo Carroll of the Kearny Scots.

== International career ==
Stark earned only two caps with the U.S. national team, both in games against Canada in 1925. His first cap came in a 1–0 loss to Canada in Quebec in June. In November, Canada came to the U.S. for a game; Stark scored five goals as the U.S. easily dispatched its northern neighbors 6–1.

While Stark received an invitation to play on the national team at the 1930 FIFA World Cup, he declined the invitation for business reasons.

In 1950, Stark was inducted into the National Soccer Hall of Fame.

== Career statistics ==
Appearances and goals by club, season, and competition. Only official games are included in this table.
Club	Season	League	League		National Cup		League Cup		Total	
Club	Season	League	Apps	Goals	Apps	Goals	Apps	Goals	Apps	Goals
Kearny Scots	1912–13	NAFBL								
Kearny Scots	1913–14	NAFBL								
Kearny Scots	1914–15	NAFBL	2+	3+	3+	3+			5+	6+
Kearny Scots	1915–16	NAFBL								
Babcock & Wilcox	1916–17	NAFBL								
West Hudson	1917–18	NAFBL								
Paterson F.C.	1918–19	NAFBL	5+	6+	2+	2+			7+	8+
Erie A.A.	1919–20	NAFBL	2+	4+					2+	4+
Erie A.A.	1920–21	NAFBL	1+	3+	2+	2+	1+	1+	4+	6+
New York Field Club	1921–22	ASL	21	13	2	2			23	15
New York Field Club	1922–23	ASL	23	11	5	6			28	17
New York Field Club	1923–24	ASL	25	21	4	3			29	24
Bethlehem Steel	1924–25	ASL	44	67			2	3	46	70
Bethlehem Steel	1925–26	ASL	37	43	5	7	3	4	45	54
Bethlehem Steel	1926–27	ASL	29	23	3	0	1	2	33	25
Bethlehem Steel	1927–28 (Note: The ASL instituted a playoff system for the 1927–28 season. In four games, Stark scored seven goals.)	ASL	46	27	2	1	4	6	52	34
Bethlehem Steel	1928–29	ASL	7	2					7	2
Bethlehem Steel	1928–29	EPSL	32	41	4	6			36	47
Bethlehem Steel	Fall 1929	EPSL	7	9					7	9
Bethlehem Steel	1929–30	ASL	19	28	5	6			24	34
Newark Americans	1930	ASL	19	12	4	3			23	15
Newark Americans	Spring 1931	ASL	12	2	1	1			13	3
Newark Americans	Fall 1931	ASL	11	4	3	1			14	5
Kearny Irish	1933–1934	ASL II	25	22					25	22
Career total			367+	319+	45+	43+	11+	16+	423+	378+

== Honors ==
- World Record holder of the Highest Season Scoring Record (67 goals, 1924/25 season)
- Seasonwise World Top Scorer: 1924-25
- U.S. single-season scoring record: 67 goals, 1924/25 season

== See also ==
- List of United States men's international soccer players born outside the United States
