= Dougie Campbell =

Scottish-American soccer player (1901–1991)

Personal information
- Full name: Dugald Campbell
- Date of birth: 16 May 1901
- Place of birth: Paisley, Scotland
- Date of death: 27 February 1991 (aged 89)
- Place of death: West Creek, New Jersey, United States
- Position: Inside forward

Senior career*
Years	Team	Apps	(Gls)
–1921	Babcock & Wilcox		
1921–1922	Philadelphia Field Club	24	(9)
1922–1923	→ Bethlehem Steel	26	(4)
1923–1928	Fall River F.C.	170	(65)
1928	New York Giants	12	(2)
1928	Bethlehem Steel	3	(1)
- * Club domestic league appearances and goals

Dugald "Dougie" Campbell (16 May 1901 – 27 February 1991) was a Scottish-American soccer inside forward who played eight seasons in the American Soccer League. He was born in Paisley, Scotland.

== History ==
Campbell's family left Scotland for the United States when he was a boy. He grew up in Philadelphia, Pennsylvania. In September 1921, Campbell joined Philadelphia Field Club from Babcock & Wilcox. From that game on, he remained a regular at either inside left or inside right with Philadelphia as they took the 1921-1922 American Soccer League championship. The team had been created in 1921 by moving the Bethlehem Steel club to Philadelphia. Following the 1921–1922 season, the ownership returned the club to Bethlehem where it took on its original identity. Campbell remained with the reconstituted Bethlehem Steel for one season, then transferred to the Fall River F.C. in August 1923. He would remain with the 'Marksmen' for five seasons, winning three league titles and two National Challenge Cup titles. In the 1927 National Challenge Cup, Campbell scored once in Fall River's 7-0 romp over Holley Carburetor F.C. In 1928, he moved to the New York Giants, but played only four games before the team was suspended by the ASL at the start of the "Soccer Wars". He reputedly continued playing with the Giants in the Eastern Professional Soccer League; however, on 20 December 1928, he signed with Bethlehem Steel, which was also now playing in the ESL. He played two games, scoring one goal, then never appeared in the Bethlehem lineup after December 1928. Following his retirement from playing, he worked in a variety of occupations, including as a builder, a fisherman and an owner of "a cranberry bog in West Creek, New Jersey".
