= Jack Kershaw (footballer) =

English footballer and manager

Personal information
- Place of birth: Lancashire, England
- Position: Center forward

Senior career*
Years	Team	Apps	(Gls)
1919–1921	Fore River		
1921–1922	J&P Coats	21	(3)
1922–1923	Fall River	8	(3)
1924–1925	Shawsheen Indians		

Managerial career
- 1922–1927: Abbot Worsted
- 1927–1928: Harvard
- * Club domestic league appearances and goals

Jack Kershaw was an English footballer who played as a center forward. He began his career in England and ended it in the United States. He was born in Lancashire, England. He played at least two seasons in the Southern New England Soccer League and two in the American Soccer League before coaching professionally and collegiately.

== Player ==
According to some sources, Kershaw began his career in the English Northern Third Division. At some point, he came to the United States and joined Fore River of the Southern New England Soccer League (SNESL). He scored a goal in Fore River's loss to Ben Millers in the 1920 National Challenge Cup. He suffered a season-ending injury sometime in December 1920 or January 1921. In 1921, the SNESL was disbanded with the creation of the American Soccer League. Fore River did not move to the new league, but Kershaw spent two seasons in the new league, first with J&P Coats in 1921–1922 and then the Fall River in 1922–1923. In 1924, Kershaw scored the season's first goal for the Shawsheen Indians in the semi-professional National League, which had replaced the SNESL. However, Kershaw is not listed on the Indians' roster when they won the 1925 National Challenge Cup.

== Coach ==
While he continued to play for various teams, Kershaw also coached Abbot Worsted for six seasons, taking the team to national prominence and winning three league championships. In 1927, Harvard University hired Kershaw as the soccer team's head coach.
