= Bart McGhee =

American soccer player

Personal information
- Full name: Bartholomew McGhee
- Date of birth: April 30, 1899
- Place of birth: Edinburgh, Scotland
- Date of death: January 26, 1979 (aged 79)
- Place of death: Philadelphia, Pennsylvania, U.S.
- Positions: Forward; left winger

Senior career*
Years	Team	Apps	(Gls)
1917–1919	New York Shipbuilding		
1919–1921	Wolfenden Shore		
1921–1922	Philadelphia Hibernian		
1922–1924	New York Field Club	48	(23)
1924–1925	Fleisher Yarn	31	(10)
1925–1931	New York Nationals	253	(97)
1929	→ Philadelphia Field Club (loan)	18	(6)

International career
1930	United States	3	(1)
Medal record
Men's soccer
Representing United States
FIFA World Cup
Third place	1930 Uruguay
- * Club domestic league appearances and goals

Bartholomew "Bertie" or "Bart" McGhee (April 30, 1899 – January 26, 1979) was a soccer player who played as a forward. Born in Scotland, he played for the United States national team at the 1930 FIFA World Cup and scored the second goal in World Cup history against Belgium. He was inducted into the U.S. National Soccer Hall of Fame in 1986.

== Youth ==
McGhee was the son of former Hibernian player and Heart of Midlothian manager James McGhee, and the brother of Philadelphia Field Club forward Jimmy McGhee. McGhee's father was a renowned Scottish player who appeared with Scotland in an 1886 game with Wales. In September 1910, McGhee's father decided to leave Scotland and emigrate to the United States. It took him two years to get settled and it was not until 1912 that Bart McGhee, his mother and elder brother by two years, Jimmy, joined his father in the U.S. When they arrived in the U.S., the family settled in Philadelphia, Pennsylvania.

== Playing ==
=== Amateur ===
When he was nineteen, McGhee began playing for New York Shipbuilding, located in Camden, New Jersey, of the South Jersey League. The next season, he moved to Wolfenden Shore, of the Allied American Football Association; playing with them until at least March 1921 when he was on trial with Bethlehem Steel F.C. before moving to Philadelphia Hibernian of the National Soccer League of Philadelphia. He played with them from 1921 to 1922.

=== Professional ===
In 1922, McGhee signed with the New York Field Club of the American Soccer League. He spent two seasons with New York before moving to Fleisher Yarn in 1924. Fleisher had existed for years as an amateur powerhouse, and in 1924 the team went professional. It was unable to maintain itself as a professional team and folded at the end of the season. When Fleisher failed, McGhee moved to Indiana Flooring which played in New York City. McGhee spent two seasons with Indiana. In 1927, Charles Stoneham, owner of the New York Giants baseball team, bought Indiana Flooring. He renamed the team the New York Nationals. That year the original New York Giants ASL club folded. Stoneham acquired the rights to the name and used it for his club. McGhee played with this team, under all its names, through 1932, except for a loan period to Philadelphia Field Club during the 1928–1929 season.

In 1928, the New York Nationals won the National Challenge Cup. In 1929, the club then won the Lewis Cup, the ASL cup competition. Under the new name, New York Giants, the club also won the 1930–1931 ASL championship.

After 1929 ASL statistics become patchy as the Great Depression and the ASL/FIFA Soccer Wars took a toll on the league. Despite this, McGhee played at least 350 games and scored 137 goals from 1921 to 1931. According to the National Soccer Hall of Fame, "There are also reports in some publications that he later played in England for Hull City. However, he [sic] son Ed, who lives in Riverton, New Jersey, told me that, apart from his trip to South America, Bart never left the U.S."

=== National team ===
McGhee earned three caps with the U.S. men's national team, all coming in the 1930 FIFA World Cup. He scored the first goal for a United States team in World Cup competition in the opening victory over Belgium, which became the 2nd goal in World Cup history, approximately 5 minutes after Lucien Laurent had scored the first for France in the parallel game with simultaneous kick-off time.

In 1986, the National Soccer Hall of Fame inducted McGhee. During his ASL career Bart McGhee played in 350 league games and scored 127 goals, almost all of them from the left wing position.

=== International goals ===
United States' goal tally first

#	Date	Venue	Opponent	Score	Result	Competition
1.	July 13, 1930	Estadio Gran Parque Central, Montevideo, Uruguay	Belgium	1–0	3–0	1930 FIFA World Cup

== See also ==
- List of United States men's international soccer players born outside the United States
