= 1928 National Challenge Cup =

Soccer tournament season

- Dewar Challenge Cup

Tournament details
- Country: United States
- Dates: 15 January 1928 – 15 April 1928

Final positions
- Champions: New York Nationals (1st title)
- Runners-up: Chicago Bricklayers
- Semifinalists: Ben Millers; J&P Coats

The 1928 National Challenge Cup was the annual open cup held by the United States Football Association now known as the Lamar Hunt U.S. Open Cup.

== Eastern Division ==
First round
January 15 - Brooklyn
Brooklyn Wanderers	4
Trenton F.C.	0
January 14 - Philadelphia
Centennial F.C.	1
Bethlehem Steel	3
January 15 - New York
New York Nationals	6
IRT Celtic	1
January 15 - Bronx
New York Giants	3
Newark Skeeters	2
January 14 - New Bedford
New Bedford Whalers	1
J&P Coats	2
January 15 - Providence
Providence F.C.	5
Danersk F.C.	0
January 15 - Tiverton
Fall River F.C.	5
Mackenzies A.F.C.	1
January 14 - Worcester
Whittall F.C.	0
Boston Soccer Club	3

Second round
January 29/February 4
Brooklyn Wanderers	1-3
Bethlehem Steel	1-2
February 5, 12 - New York
New York Nationals	2-2
New York Giants	2-1
January 28 - Pawtucket
J&P Coats	1
Providence FC	0
January 29 - Tiverton
Fall River F.C.	2
Boston SC	1

Semi-finals
February 26 - Brooklyn
Brooklyn Wanderers	0
New York Nationals	1
February 26 - Providence
J&P Coats	2
Fall River F.C.	1

Final
March 18 - New York
New York Nationals	5
J&P Coats	3

== Western Division ==
First round
January 22 - St. Louis
Ben Millers	2
Swedish-American A.C.	0
January 15 - Chicago
Canadian Club	4
Tablers	1
January 15 - Cleveland
American-Hungarians	2
Wellston	1
January 22 - Chicago
Vienna F.C.	1
Thistles F.C.	0
January 15 - Detroit
Garwood F.C.	2
Bricklayers	5
January 15 - St. Louis
Morgan Haulers	3
Buda AA	6
January 22 - Detroit
Walkerville F.C.	0
Holley Carburetor	5
January 22 - Chicago
Sparta ABA	2
Olympia F.C.	0

Second round
February 5 - St. Louis
Ben Millers	2
Canadian Club	1
February 5 - Cleveland
American-Hungarians	5
Vienna F.C.	2
February 5 - Chicago
Bricklayers	4
Buda AA	0
February 5 - Detroit
Holley Carburetor	3
Sparta ABA	4

Semi-finals
February 26 - St. Louis
Ben Millers	4
American-Hungarians	3
February 26 - Chicago
Bricklayers	1
Sparta ABA	0

Final
March 18 - St. Louis
Ben Millers	0
Bricklayers	2

== Final ==
April 8, 1928

New York Nationals (NY)	1–1 (a.e.t.)	Bricklayers (IL)
Wortmann 30'		Cuthbert 8'

Polo Grounds, New York, New York
Attendance: 16,000
Referee: James Walder (USA)
April 15, 1928

Bricklayers (IL)	0–3	New York Nationals (NY)
		Henderson 12', 39'; Wortmann 60'

Soldier Field, Chicago, Illinois
Attendance: 15,000
Referee: James Walder (USA)
