= Charles Stoneham =

American sports executive

Charles Abraham Stoneham
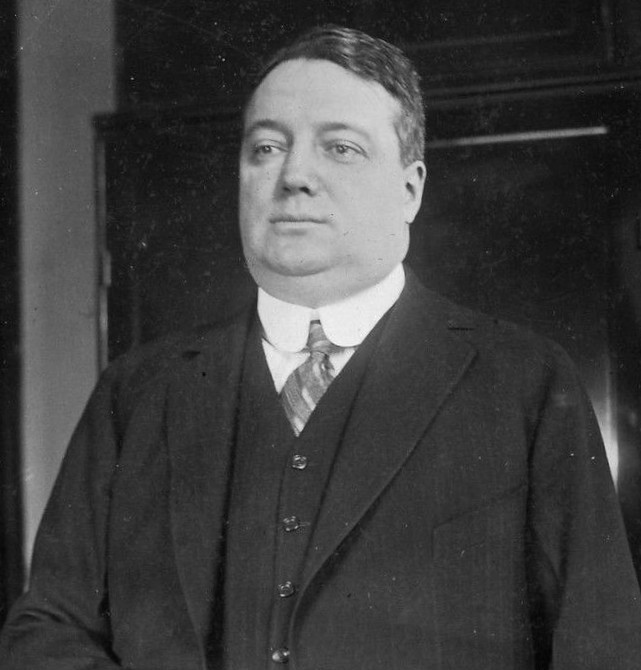
- Born: July 5, 1876; Jersey City, New Jersey, U.S.
- Died: January 6, 1936 (aged 59); Hot Springs, Arkansas, U.S.
- Resting place: Holy Name Cemetery (Jersey City, New Jersey)
- Known for: New York Giants; New York Nationals

Charles Abraham Stoneham (July 5, 1876 – January 6, 1936) was the owner of the New York Giants baseball team and New York Nationals soccer team. He was at the center of numerous corruption scandals and was also the instigator of the "Soccer Wars" which destroyed the American Soccer League.

== Business ventures ==
Stoneham began his career as a board boy, updating stock transactions, in a New York City brokerage office. He quickly rose through the ranks, becoming a stock salesman in the company. In 1913, he established his own brokerage, Charles A. Stoneham & Company. In 1917, he also purchased the Sierra Nevada mine in Jefferson, Nevada. In 1921, Stoneham dissolved his brokerage house, convincing his investors to transfer their accounts to various other New York brokerage firms. In July 1922, E.M. Fuller & Company, one of the brokerages which accepted Stoneham's clients, collapsed, resulting in the Fuller bankruptcy case implicating Stoneham.

Allegations arose that Stoneham was a silent partner in the firm and had provided false testimony in the investigation of the collapse. He was indicted on August 31, 1923, by a Federal grand jury for perjury. While this case was building, another of the brokerage firms associated with the dissolution of Stoneham's, E.D. Dier & Company, also collapsed. Once again, allegations of criminal activity began to swirl around him and in September 1923, he was indicted by the Federal government for mail fraud related to defrauding the Dier company's clients. He was acquitted of these charges on February 6, 1925. Although he was cleared of most charges in each case, the taint of scandal never fully left him.

== Relationship with Arnold Rothstein ==
Stoneham had a close business relationship with Arnold Rothstein, a notorious organized crime boss who ran numerous gambling operations. Rothstein, best known for fixing the 1919 World Series, brokered Stoneham's purchase of the New York Giants baseball team in 1919. He also co-owned a billiard parlour with Stoneham's right-hand man, Giants manager John McGraw.

== Gambling operations ==
Stoneham himself was an inveterate gambler and the owner of numerous gambling operations, including the Oriental Park Racetrack, and Havana Casino in Havana, Cuba. He was eventually forced to sell these operations in 1923, as part of an anti-corruption campaign waged by baseball commissioner Kenesaw Mountain Landis. However, for several more years he continued to operate a Thoroughbred racing stable from a base in New York.

== Baseball ==
In 1919, Stoneham purchased the New York Giants baseball team for one million dollars. He took on longtime manager John McGraw and New York municipal judge Francis Xavier McQuade as partners, with McGraw becoming vice president and McQuade becoming treasurer. He owned the team until his death in 1936, passing it to his son Horace Stoneham. During his tenure as owner, Stoneham saw the Giants win the World Series in 1921, 1922 and 1933.

Stoneham was also involved in the aborted move of the New York Yankees to Boston in 1920. The Yankees, the city's second team, had leased the Polo Grounds from the Giants since 1913. At the time, the American League was riven by an internecine war, with the Yankees, Boston Red Sox and Chicago White Sox on one side and American League president Ban Johnson and the other five clubs on the other. With the acquisition of Babe Ruth in 1920, the once-moribund Yankees suddenly became competitive and outdrew the Giants.

To destroy one of the three teams that opposed him, Johnson persuaded Stoneham to evict the Yankees. This would give Johnson an excuse to force Yankees' owners Jacob Ruppert and Cap Huston to sell the Yankees to a more pliable owner; Johnson even went as far as to promise Stoneham that he could choose Ruppert and Huston's replacement. The move backfired when Ruppert and Huston announced that if Stoneham evicted the Yankees from the Polo Grounds, the Yankees would move to Boston's Fenway Park as tenants of the Red Sox. They would have been well within their rights to do so, since Red Sox owner Harry Frazee had pledged Fenway Park as collateral for a loan from Ruppert. Stoneham realized that if the Yankees left town, he'd lose revenue from a valuable tenant. He also didn't want to be held responsible for forcing Ruth, the biggest star in the game, out of town. With these factors in mind, he renewed the Yankees' lease for one more year. The incident led the Yankees to construct their own park, Yankee Stadium, to ensure that no other team would have the power to deny them a place to play.

== Football ==
In 1919, Charles Stoneham made an aborted attempt to organize a professional football team to play at the Polo Grounds in New York City. The team was to be called the New York Giants. Contracts and verbal agreements to play were made with a number of former collegiate football stars and its first game was scheduled for October 12, 1919. The game was to be played against Massillon Ohio, one of the professional powerhouses of the day. Alfred O. Gennert, a former star for Princeton and one of the players whose name was used in promoting the team, publicly denounced the unauthorized use of his name and the concept of professional football in general. He was quoted as saying, "I would not play football for money on Sunday or any other afternoon. I believe that any attempt to professionalize football is a direct attack on the best traditions of the game and should be resented by all loyal devotees." The team folded within one week of that report, before its first scheduled game. New York City remained without a professional team until the New York Giants were finally organized for good in 1925.

== Soccer ==
In addition to baseball, Stoneham also had a significant part in US soccer history. At the time, the American Soccer League was the second most popular professional league behind major league baseball, attracting large crowds and drawing many of Europe's best players with its excellent pay and high level of play. On September 8, 1927, Stoneham purchased the Indiana Flooring franchise. While he wanted to rename the team the Giants, he was prevented by the fact the league already had a Giants team. Therefore, he settled on renaming his team the New York Nationals.

His infamy in soccer came as a result of his role in precipitating the "Soccer Wars" which led to the destruction of the ASL. Soccer in the US is overseen by a single organizing body, at the time known as the United States Football Association. The USFA ran an annual national single-elimination tournament known as the National Challenge Cup. Even though the Nationals had won the 1928 National Challenge Cup over Bricklayers and Masons F.C. of Chicago, Stoneham and several other owners had grown frustrated by the high costs associated with this cup. Therefore, as league vice president he instigated a boycott of the competition. When three teams defied the league and entered the cup, they were expelled from the ASL. The USFA then labeled the ASL an "outlaw league" and bankrolled the creation of the Eastern Soccer League to compete directly against the ASL. The financial toll brought about by the Soccer War forced the capitulation of the ASL in 1929.

However, the league was permanently crippled. The onset of the Great Depression worsened the league's financial situation and it limped on for three more years before collapsing. Before that happened, Stoneham finally gained his New York Giants soccer team in 1931 when the original Giants was renamed the New York Soccer Club. Stoneham withdrew his team from the ASL in 1932 and disbanded it.

== Politics ==
Stoneham was also a member of the Tammany Hall political machine.

== Death ==
For several years before his death, Stoneham had been suffering from a variety of physical ailments which were eventually diagnosed as symptoms of Bright's disease. He died in a hotel in Hot Springs, Arkansas, on January 6, 1936, after spending several days in a coma. His son and heir Horace Stoneham was at his bedside. Horace would own the team until 1976, moving it to San Francisco in 1958.
