= Albert Mitchell =

American soccer player

Personal information
- Full name: Albert Mitchell
- Position: Center forward

Senior career*
| Years | Team | Apps | (Gls) |
| –1921 | Tebo Yacht Basin | | |
| 1921–1922 | J&P Coats | 15 | (5) |
| 1922–1923 | New York Field Club | 7 | (5) |
- * Club domestic league appearances and goals

Albert Mitchell was a U.S. soccer center forward who played two seasons in the American Soccer League.

In 1922, J&P Coats of the American Soccer League acquired Mitchell from top amateur club Tebo Yacht Basin F.C. He had an excellent season with Tebo, leading the team in scoring as it took the New York State League title. However, he never settled into J&P Coats, despite scoring five goals in fifteen games. As a result, he was shipped to New York Field Club for the 1922–1923 season. He played only seven league game, scoring five goals before leaving the league.
