= Celtic F.C. (Jersey City) =

- Full name: Celtic Football Club
- Nickname: Jersey City Celtics
- Founded: 1921
- Dissolved: December 1921
- Stadium: West Side Park
- League: American Soccer League
- 1921-22: folded after 5 games

The Celtic Football Club, commonly called the Jersey City Celtics, was an American soccer club based in Jersey City, New Jersey. The club was organized in the summer of 1921 to be an inaugural member of the professional American Soccer League. The club folded after five games.

== History ==
The owners of Celtics put over $6,000 into establishing their team which played in a baseball stadium. In July 1921, they played Third Lanark in preparation for the upcoming season. After losing its first five games, the ownership withdrew the team from the league, dissolved it, and forfeited its franchise in early December. Like a number of the ASL teams that season the Celtics lost considerable money. The system was for home teams to get the gate receipts instead of a percent to both teams. Since the Celtics were not able to use their home ground well into late October they played all their ASL games away.

== Year-by-year ==
Year	Division	League	Reg. season	Playoffs	National Cup
1921-22	1	ASL	0-0-5	No playoff	Second Round

== Matches ==
=== Friendlies ===
July 10, 1921
3:30 PM

Celtics	2–4	Third Lanark
Rankin; Wilson ' McBain; Thompson		80' Hosie; Sweeney

West Side Park
Jersey City, New Jersey
Attendance: 6000
Referee: James Schofield

Celtic Lineup: GK Whelan, LB Lappin, RB Reynolds, LHB Irvine, CHB Gallagher, RHB Tom Stark(c), OL Sweeney, IL Hosie, CF McKenna, IR A.Stark, OR Downie.

=== ASL ===
September 18, 1921

Todd Shipyards	7–0	Celtics
5' McKenna; McGuire; McKenna; Campbell; McGuire; Hosie; McKenna

Todd Field
Brooklyn, New York
Referee: T. Cunningham

Celtic Lineup: GK Thompson, LB Reid, RB Gilfallan, LHB Crilley, CHB Peat, RHB Gibson, OL Boyle, IL O'Harra, CF D.Fitzpatrick, IR J.Fitzpatrick, OR Smith.

September 25, 1921
3:00 PM

NY Field Club	6–2	Celtics
Duggan; Philp; Bleich; A.Stark; 65' Kelly(pk); Hardy		Baird; J. Fitzpatrick

New York Oval
New York, NY
Referee: Thomas Cunningham

Celtic Lineup: GK Reilly, LB Gallagher, RB Gilfillan, LHB Peat, CHB Trimble, RHB Boyle, OL Reid, IL D.Fitzpatrick, CF McDonald, IR Baird, OR J.Fitzpatrick.

October 1, 1921
3:00 PM

Falco	3–1	Celtics
Walter Dowdall; 60' Moir; 65' Brown		15' J. Fitzpatrick

Falco Field
Holyoke, MA
Attendance: 6000
Referee: James Schofield

Celtic Lineup: GK Reilly, LB Gallagher, RB Concalves, LHB Peat, CHB Trimble, RHB Boyle, OL Reed, IL D.Fitzpatrick, CF J.Fitzpatrick, IR McDonald, OR Baird.

October 8, 1921
3:00 PM

Fall River United	4–2	Celtics
Timoney; Fred Parker(pk); Lynch; Weir		1' J. Fitzpatrick; 89' McDonald(pk)

Athletic Grounds
Fall River, MA
Attendance: 1500
Referee: H. Starswell

Celtic Lineup: GK Reilly, LB Gallagher, RB Concalves, LHB Peat, CHB Trimble, RHB Boyle, OL Reed, IL D.Fitzpatrick, CF J.Fitzpatrick, IR McDonald, OR Baird.

October 29, 1921
3:00 PM

J&P Coats	4–0	Celtics
Millar(2); Lappin; Kershaw

Coats Field
Pawtucket, RI
Attendance: 2000
Referee: Edward Pemberton

Celtic Lineup: GK Reilly, LB Campbell, RB Gilfillan, LHB Waite, CHB Peat, RHB Trimble, OL Fox, IL Baird, CF J.Fitzpatrick, IR Masterson, OR Boyle.

=== NCC ===
October 23, 1921
1st round

Celtics	5–0	Federal Ship

Referee: R. McMahon
November 1921
2nd round

Harrison	3–1	Celtics

Referee: R. McMahon

== Roster ==
Note: Flags indicate national team as defined under FIFA eligibility rules; some limited exceptions apply. Players may hold more than one non-FIFA nationality.

No.	Pos.	Nation	Player
—	MF		Samuel Gilfillan
—			Boyle
—	MF		Peat
—			John Fitzpatrick
—			Daniel Fitzpatrick
—			Alex C. Reid
—	GK		Reilly
—			Trimble
—			Baird
—			McDonald
—			Jim Shanholt

No.	Pos.	Nation	Player
—			Gilson
—			Thomson
—			Joseph Crilley
—			Smith
—			Pat O'Hara
—			Gallagher
—			Campbell
—			White
—			Fox
—			Masterton

== Notes and references ==
Bibliography

- Jose, Colin (1998). The American Soccer League: The Golden Years of American Soccer 1921-1931. Lanham, Maryland: Scarecrow Press. ISBN 978-0810834293.
- Cahill, Thomas W., ed. (1921). Spalding's Official "Soccer" Football Guide 1921-22. Spalding's "Red Cover" Series of Athletic Handbooks, No. 55R. New York: American Sports Publishing Company.
- Cahill, Thomas W., ed. (1922). Spalding's Official "Soccer" Football Guide 1922-23. Spalding's "Red Cover" Series of Athletic Handbooks, No. 55R. New York: American Sports Publishing Company.

Footnotes
