= Holyoke Falcos =

Falco F.C.
- Full name: Falco A.A.F.C.
- Nickname: Holyoke Falcos
- Founded: ?
- Dissolved: ?
- Ground: Farr Alpaca Field; Holyoke, Massachusetts
- League: American Soccer League last known
- 1921-22: 7th

Falco F.C., commonly known as the Holyoke Falcos, was an American soccer club based in Holyoke, Massachusetts, that was a founding member of the professional American Soccer League, but withdrew at the end of the first season. The team was sponsored by the Farr Alpaca Company, a local textile mill.

== Year-by-year ==
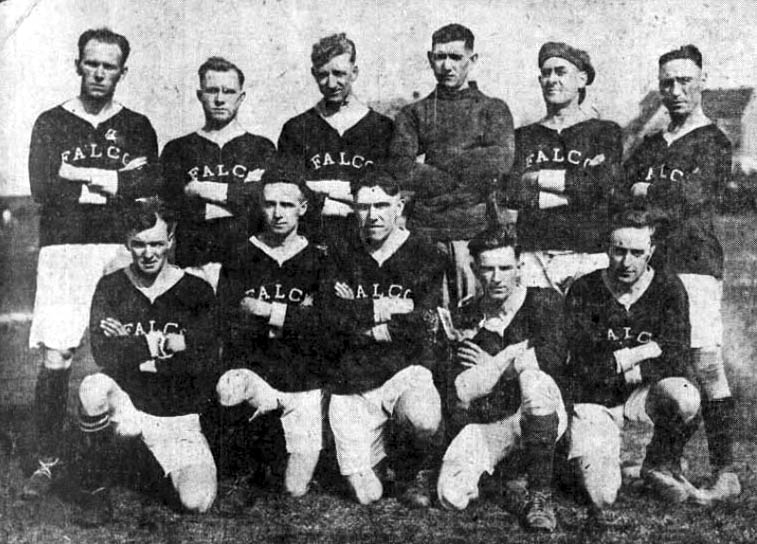
Falco soccer team in 1922

Year	Division	League	Reg. season	Play-offs	National Cup
1921–22	1	ASL	7th	No playoff	Quarterfinals
1922–23					
1923–24					Fourth round
