= Fall River United =

Fall River United was a United States soccer club, based in Fall River, Massachusetts. They played in the American Soccer League during the 1921–22 season.

== History ==
In 1921 the Southern New England Soccer League and the National Association Football League effectively merged to form the American Soccer League. A new team Fall River United were formed to enter the ASL. In a pre-season game on July 21, 1921 a team that included Chick Albion, Tommy McFarlane and Harry Ratican, held Third Lanark to a 2–2 draw. Ratican scored United’s opening goal. Third Lanark featured many guest players from other Scottish teams and was virtually a Scottish League XI. They played 25 games during their North American tour, winning them all until they played United in the final game. However, during the subsequent 1921–22 season United struggled, finishing sixth out of eight during the inaugural ASL season. Although they did not do well in the standings they had done well financially. The following season they could not agree to terms on a lease for their playing grounds. A joint bid with the Fall River Rovers to continue in the ASL was denied while Sam Mark's bid was accepted by the league. He built a new stadium at Tiverton, RI to host his new team Fall River F.C.

== Year-by-year ==
| Year | Division | League | Reg. season | National Challenge Cup |
|---|---|---|---|---|
| 1921–22 | 1 | ASL | 6th | Third Round |
