= New York Nationals (ASL) =

American soccer club (1927–1930)

New York Nationals were a New York City soccer team which played in the American Soccer League between 1927 and 1930. A New York Nationals team also played in the United Soccer League in 1984.

== History ==
In 1927, Charles Stoneham, owner of the New York Giants baseball team took over the ASL Indiana Flooring franchise. He wanted to rename the team the Giants. However, as there was already a New York Giants in the ASL, Stoneham had to settle for renaming his soccer team the New York Nationals. Nationals won the 1928 National Challenge Cup, beating Chicago's Bricklayers and Masons F.C. 4–1 on aggregate in the final. Then in 1929 they won the Lewis Cup, the ASL league cup, defeating New Bedford Whalers over three games. On May 25, 1930 at the Polo Grounds, the Nationals played a friendly against Rangers, the reigning Scottish champions. They lost this game 5–4. The Nationals most prominent players included Jimmy Douglas, Jimmy Gallagher, Bart McGhee and Robert Millar. The former three all played for the United States at the 1930 World Cup while Millar was the team coach.

In 1930 the New York Giants of the ASL decided to rename themselves the New York Soccer Club. Seizing upon the opportunity, Stoneham relaunched the Nationals as the New York Giants. One player Davey Brown actually transferred from the original Giants to the Nationals, in effect moving from the Giants to the Giants!

== Year-by-year ==
Season	Div.	League			National cup
Season	Div.	Assoc.	Reg. season	Playoffs	National cup
1927–28	1	ASL	10th, 3rd (Note: Positions in first and second halves, respectively.)	Did not qualify	Champion
1928–29	N/A	ASL	3rd, 4th	Did not qualify	Did not participate
Fall 1929	1	ASL	4th	No playoff	N/A
1929–30	1	ACL/ASL	5th, 8th (Note: Positions in Spring and Fall seasons, respectively.)	No playoff	Second round

== Honors ==
- National Challenge Cup
  - Winners 1928: 1
- Lewis Cup
  - Winners 1929: 1
- American Soccer Association Cup
  - Runners up 1929: 1

== Notable coaches ==
- (United States) (Scotland) Robert Millar 1927–1928
- Henry Farrell 1928
