= Paterson F.C. (NAFBL) =

American soccer team

Paterson FC
- Full name: Paterson Football Club
- Founded: 1917?
- Dissolved: 1923; 103 years ago (continued as New York Giants F.C.)
- Ground: Paterson, New Jersey
- Owner: Adolph Buslik
- League: ASL
- 1922–23: Champions

Paterson F.C. was an early twentieth-century American soccer club based in Paterson, New Jersey. It spent three seasons in the National Association Football League, winning one title, and one season in the American Soccer League.

== History ==
In 1917, Paterson joined the National Association Football League, winning the 1917–18 championship. When several teams from the NAFBL left the league in 1921 to form the American Soccer League, Paterson did not join them.

A year later, Adolph Buslik, a wealthy New York fur merchant, purchased the club and the former Falco F.C. franchise in the American Soccer League.

The club entered the league for the 1922–23 season. That same season Paterson also won the 1922–23 National Challenge Cup defeating St. Louis Scullin Steel in the final.

Following that season, Buslik moved the franchise to New York and renamed it the National Giants Football Club.

== Year-by-year ==
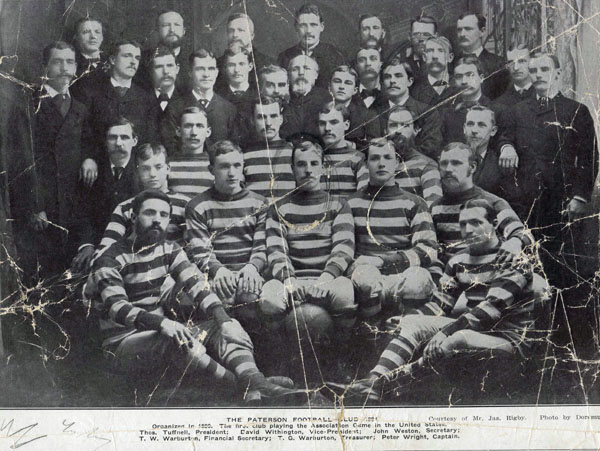
The Paterson team that won the 1923 Dewar Cup

Season	Div.	League		National cups	
Season	Div.	Assoc.	Position	Challenge Cup	American Cup
1917–18	1	NAFBL	Champion	Quarterfinals	Second Round
1918–19	1	NAFBL	3rd	Runner Up	Runner Up
1919–20	1	NAFBL	4th	?	Quarterfinals
1920–21	1	NAFBL	Withdrew	Third round	Third round
1922–23	1	ASL	5th	Champion	Semifinals

== Coaches ==
- John Ford (1919–23)

== See also ==
- New York Giants (soccer)
