= Indiana Flooring =

American soccer team

Indiana Flooring were a New York City soccer team that played in the American Soccer League between 1924 and 1927. They replaced New York Field Club. Before joining the ASL, the team had played in various state leagues.

Ernest Viberg, a former trainer who acted as an interpreter for Bethlehem Steel when they toured Sweden in 1919, initially took control of the franchise. However, in 1927 it was bought by Charles Stoneham, owner of the New York Giants baseball team. In subsequent seasons they played as the New York Nationals and then as the New York Giants.

== Year-by-year ==
Year	Division	League	Reg. season	Playoffs	U.S. Open Cup
1924/25	1	ASL	9th	No playoff	Did not enter
1925/26	1	ASL	6th	No playoff	First round
1926/27	1	ASL	6th	No playoff	Second round

== Notable coaches ==
- (United States) (Scotland) Robert Millar 1925–1927
