= Philadelphia Field Club =

Soccer club in Philadelphia, Pennsylvania

Philadelphia Field Club is a name used by four soccer teams based in Philadelphia, Pennsylvania. All four versions of Philadelphia F.C. competed in the first American Soccer League, but none were in any way related to the other three teams which shared its name.

== Philadelphia F.C. ==
Philadelphia F.C. was an inaugural club of the American Soccer League based in Philadelphia, Pennsylvania. Before the season, the owners of the powerful Bethlehem Steel F.C. decided to disband the club and form Philadelphia F.C. The club re-signed most of the top players from Bethlehem and players from elsewhere. Not surprisingly the team won the first ASL championship. After the season, the management broke up the team selling many of its top players due to financial trouble and lack of support. The team then returned to Bethlehem.

=== Year-by-year ===
Year	Division	League	Reg. season	Playoffs	National Cup
1921/22	1	ASL	1st	Champion (no playoff)	Fourth round

== Philadelphia F.C./Celtic ==
After the first Philadelphia F.C. returned to Bethlehem, a new team also called Philadelphia F.C. joined the American Soccer League for its second season. The new team was the polar opposite of the powerful Bethlehem languishing at the bottom of the table

After the 1926/27 season, the team was bought by new management who bought top talent from Ireland and renamed the club Philadelphia Celtic. The spending spree left the owners in financial straits and the club went bankrupt and were suspended by the league after playing only 10 games in the first half of the 1927/28 season.

=== Year-by-year ===
Year	Division	League	Reg. season	Playoffs	National Cup
1922/23	1	ASL	8th	No playoff	?
1923/24	1	ASL	7th	No playoff	?
1924/25	1	ASL	12th	No playoff	Did not enter
1925/26	1	ASL	11th	No playoff	Second round
1926/27	1	ASL	11th	No playoff	First round
1927/28	1	ASL	12th (1st half)	N/A	N/A

== Philadelphia F.C. III ==
A third Philadelphia F.C. joined the American Soccer League the season after the Philadelphia Celtic was suspended. The team played a limited schedule and folded after its only season.

=== Year-by-year ===
Year	Division	League	Reg. season	Playoffs	National Cup
1928/29	1	ASL	7th (1st half); 6th (2nd half)	Did not qualify	?

== Bridgeport Bears/Philadelphia F.C. ==
The Bridgeport Bears joined the American Soccer League in the fall of 1929. After only six games the team moved to Philadelphia to become another Philadelphia Field Club. They played eight more games before the season was suspended due to the merger of the ASL and the Eastern Soccer League.

=== Year-by-year ===
Year	Division	League	Reg. season	Playoffs	National Cup
Fall 1929	1	ASL	9th	No playoff	N/A
