= New York Giants (soccer) =

Soccer teams in the United States

New York Giants was a name used by three different New York City soccer teams. Two of these teams were associated with the New York Giants baseball franchise. The first team that used the name played in the American League of Professional Football in 1894. The second team played in the American Soccer League between 1923 and 1930 while the third team played in the same league between 1930 and 1932.

The two Giants of the ASL were involved in a confusing name change. In 1930 after the original ASL Giants changed their name to New York Soccer Club, a rival team, the New York Nationals then changed their name to the Giants. One player, Davey Brown actually transferred from the original Giants to the Nationals, in effect moving from the Giants to the Giants. In 1931 the new Giants became ASL champions after beating New Bedford Whalers, a successor team of the original Giants, in a play-off.

== History ==
=== New York Giants I ===
In 1894 six baseball franchises belonging to the National League organised the ALPF, the first professional soccer league in the United States. Apart from the New York Giants, the other teams who took part were Brooklyn Bridegrooms, Baltimore Orioles, Boston Beaneaters, Philadelphia Phillies and Washington Senators. The 1894 Giants played in an all white kit with black socks and played their home matches at the Polo Grounds. Organizational and financial problems caused the ALPF to fold before the season was completed. At the time the Giants were placed fourth after winning two games out of six.

=== National Giants F.C./New York Giants II ===
The next New York Giants played in the American Soccer League between 1923 and 1930. Following the 1922-23 season, the then 1923 National Challenge Cup holders, Paterson F.C. franchise was moved to New York by owner, Adolph Buslik. The club was renamed as National Giants F.C.. During the 1923-24 season, Buslik sold the franchise to Maurice Vandeweghe. Prior to the purchase, Vandeweghe had been part-owner and manager of New York S.C. The club was renamed as the New York Giants F.C. the following season.

In 1926 they reached the final of the Lewis Cup but lost 5–4 over two games to New Bedford Whalers. During 1926 the Giants also provided opposition for touring European teams. On May 29 they lost 2–1 to SC Hakoah Wien and on then on September 12 they lost 6–0 to Sparta Prague.

After their tour, several Hakoah players opted to stay in the United States and in subsequent seasons Béla Guttmann, Erno Schwarz, Egon Pollack, Max Grünwald, Moritz Häusler, and Max Gold all played for the Giants. Guttmann played 83 games and scored two goals for the team over two seasons. In the summer of 1927 SC Hakoah Wien returned for another tour and several of their former players, then playing for the Giants, joined them as guests. During this tour the Giants again played Hakoah and on May 1 held them to a 2–2 draw.

In 1928 the Giants found themselves at the center of the Soccer War, a power struggle between the ASL and the US Football Association. The ASL called for their members to boycott the USFA-organized National Challenge Cup. However the Giants, together with Bethlehem Steel and Newark Skeeters, were one of three teams that defied the ASL and entered anyway. This trio of clubs subsequently left the ASL to join the new USFA-organized Eastern Soccer League. Maurice Vanderweghe, while continuing to own the Giants franchise, also set up the New York Hakoah franchise for the ESL. The core of this new team was made up from former SC Hakoah Wien players then playing for the Giants. 1929 also saw the Giants continue to play touring European teams. In March 1929 they played Sabaria of Budapest in a two-game series, losing 6–4 and winning 21. Then on May 19 they drew 1–1 with Preston North End.

By the end of 1929 the ASL/USFA dispute was resolved and the ASL and ESL were merged. The Giants were readmitted and New York Hakoah joined the ASL for the first time. Since Maurice Vandeweghe owned both the Giants and Hakoah he was forced to sell Hakoah to comply with ASL rules. Four Giants players – Jim Brown, George Moorhouse, Shamus O'Brien and Philip Slone – were included in the United States squad for the 1930 World Cup.

In subsequent seasons the club was involved in several name changes and mergers. They briefly played as the New York Soccer Club before merging with the Fall River F.C. in 1931 to become the New York Yankees. They later moved to New Bedford, Massachusetts, and became the New Bedford Whalers.

=== New York Giants III ===
In 1927 Charles Stoneham, owner of the New York Giants baseball team took over the ASL Indiana Flooring franchise. He wanted to rename the team the Giants. However, as there was already a New York Giants in the ASL, Stoneham had to settle for renaming his soccer team New York Nationals. In 1930 when the original ASL Giants decided to rename themselves the New York Soccer Club, Stoneham seized the opportunity to rename the Nationals the New York Giants. The new Giants were subsequently ASL Spring champions in 1931. They also finished as runners-up to New Bedford Whalers in the Fall championship. They then beat Whalers 9–8 on aggregate in a two-game play-off to become overall champions for 1931. On May 24, 1931, at the Polo Grounds a Giants team featuring Davey Brown, Jimmy Gallagher and Bart McGhee lost 3–2 in a friendly against Celtic. The Giants withdrew from the ASL in 1932.

== Year-by-year ==
Year	Division	League	Reg. season	Playoffs	U.S. Open Cup
1923–24	1	ASL	6th	No playoff	?
1924/25	1	ASL	8th	No playoff	Did not enter
1925–26	1	ASL	9th	No playoff	Quarterfinals
1926–27	1	ASL	5th	No playoff	First round
1927–28	1	ASL	6th (1st half); 7th (2nd half)	Did not qualify	Second round
1928–29	1	ASL	left league after 8 games	N/A	N/A
1928–29	1	ESL	2nd (1st half); 5th (2nd half)	No playoff	Semifinals
1929	1	ESL	3rd	No playoff	N/A
1929–30	1	ACL	8th	No playoff	
1930	1	ACL/ASL	5th (Spring); 8th (Fall)	No playoff	Second round
1931	1	ASL	1st (Spring); 2nd (Fall)	Champion	First round
Spring 1932	1	ASL	?	No playoff	Semifinals

== Honors ==
New York Giants II

- New York State Challenge Cup
  - Winners 1929: 1
- Lewis Cup
  - Runners Up 1926: 1

New York Giants III

- American Soccer League
  - Winners 1931: 1
