= New York Field Club =

American soccer club

New York F.C. (also known as the New York Field Club) was a name used by two early twentieth-century American soccer clubs.

== History ==
Founded in 1916 as the New York Football Club, the team was originally a member of the semi-professional National Association Football League. In 1921, the team name changed to New York Soccer Club as it became an inaugural member of the professional American Soccer League in 1921. The club won the Southern New York State Football Association (a challenge cup) in 1922.

== Year-by-year ==
Year	Division	League	Reg. season	Playoffs	American Cup	National Cup
1916/17	N/A	NAFBL	4th	No playoff	Quarterfinals	Quarterfinals
1917/18	N/A	NAFBL	7th	No playoff	Second Round	Third Round
1918/19	N/A	NAFBL	5th	No playoff	?	Quarterfinals
1919/20	N/A	NAFBL	5th	No playoff	?	Quarterfinals
1920/21	N/A	NAFBL	2nd	No playoff	?	First Round
1921/22	1	ASL	2nd	No playoff	?	Third Round
1922/23	1	ASL	4th	No playoff	?	Quarterfinals
1923/24	1	ASL	3rd	No playoff	Semifinals	Fourth Round

=== Managers ===
- Hugh Magee (1920-1922)

== New York Field Club II ==
The second New York Field Club was also a member of the American Soccer League.

== Year-by-year ==
Year	Division	League	Reg. season	Playoffs	National Cup
Fall 1932	1	ASL	4th	No playoff	First Round
