= 1921–22 Todd Shipyards F.C. season =

Todd Shipyards F.C.
1921-22 season
- Stadium: Todd Shipyards Athletic Field
- American Soccer League: 3rd
- National Challenge Cup: Runners-up
- Southern New York State Football Association Cup: Runners-up
- Top goalscorer: Frank McKenna (15)
- Biggest win: 7 goals 7-0 vs. Celtic F.C. (18 September 1921)
- Biggest defeat: 3 goals 0-3 at New York F.C. (13 November 1921); 0-3 at New York F.C. (30 April 1922)

The 1921–22 Todd Shipyards F.C. season was the first season for Todd Shipyards F.C. and its first season in the American Soccer League. The Todd Shipyards Corporation had previously fielded the professional Robins Dry Dock F.C. and the amateur Tebo Yacht Basin F.C. The company combined the clubs to form Todd Shipyards F.C. and entered that club in the American Soccer League.

Todd Shipyards F.C. finished 3rd in the league. The company decided not to operate a team the following season and their spot was filled by the Brooklyn Wanderers a month into the 1922-23 season.

== American Soccer League ==
Date	Opponents	H/A	Result F–A	Scorers	Attendance
18 September 1921	Celtic F.C.	H	7-0 (Note: Game removed from standings after Jersey City forfeited their franchise in December.)	McKenna (3), McGuire (2), Campbell, Hosie	
25 September 1921	Harrison S.C.	H	3-2	Fryer, McKelvey, McKenna	
1 October 1921	J. & P. Coats F.C.	A	0-0		
2 October 1921	Philadelphia F.C.	H	0-2		
9 October 1921	Falco F.C.	H	0-0		
22 October 1921	Fall River F.C.	A	2-0	McKelvey, McKenna	
23 October 1921	J. & P. Coats F.C.	H	4-1	McGuire (2), McKenna (2)	
29 October 1921	Falco F.C.	A	4-1	McKelvey, McGuire (2), McKenna (2)	
30 October 1921	Falco F.C.	H	6-2	McGuire (2), McKenna (2), Sweeney (2)	
13 November 1921	New York F.C.	A	0-3		
20 November 1921	Harrison S.C.	A	2-0	Fryer, Sweeney	
17 December 1921	Philadelphia F.C.	A	1-1	Sweeney	
18 December 1921	New York F.C.	H	2-1	McKelvey, Clarke	
31 December 1921	J. & P. Coats F.C.	A	2-3	Ratican, own goal	
2 January 1922	Fall River F.C.	A	1-2	Shaw	
8 January 1922	J. & P. Coats F.C.	H	0-1		
22 January 1922	Harrison S.C.	A	2-3	McGuire (2)	
5 February 1922	Philadelphia F.C.	H	6-3	McGuire (2), Fryer, Sweeney, Ratican, Smith	
26 February 1922	New York F.C.	H	3-4	F. Adams, Lance, Clarke	
26 March 1922	Falco F.C.	H	4-0	McKenna, J. Black (3)	
1 April 1922	Philadelphia F.C.	A	1-1	Smith	
2 April 1922	New York F.C.	A	2-2	McKenna (2)	
16 April 1922	Harrison S.C.	H	3-1	McKelvey, McGuire, McKenna	
19 April 1922	Falco F.C.	A	6-3	McKelvey (2), Smith, Hosie, Shaw, McKenna	
22 April 1922	Fall River F.C.	A	2-1	McKenna (2)	

Pos	Club	Pld	W	D	L	GF	GA	GD	Pts
1	Philadelphia F.C.	24	17	4	3	72	36	+36	38
2	New York F.C.	24	14	5	5	59	33	+26	33
3	Todd Shipyards F.C.	24	12	5	7	56	37	+19	29
4	Harrison S.C.	24	8	7	8	45	44	+1	23
5	J. & P. Coats F.C.	23	9	5	9	34	40	-6	23
6	Fall River F.C.	24	5	1	18	28	57	-29	11
7	Falco F.C.	22	2	3	17	17	64	-47	7
n/a	Celtic F.C.	5	0	0	5	5	24	-19	0

Pld = Matches played; W = Matches won; D = Matches drawn; L = Matches lost; GF = Goals for; GA = Goals against; Pts = Points

== National Challenge Cup ==
Date	Round	Opponents	H/A	Result F–A	Scorers	Attendance
16 October 1921	First Round; Eastern Division; Southern New York District	Brooklyn F.C.	H	8-2	Fryer, McKelvey (3), McGuire (2), Hosie (2)	
5 November 1921	Second Round; Eastern Division; Southern New York District	Yonkers Thistle F.C.	H	6-1	McGuire, McKenna (3), Hosie, Sweeney	
27 November 1921	Third Round; Eastern Division; Northern and Southern New York District	New York F.C.	H	postponed		
4 December 1921	Third Round; Eastern Division; Northern and Southern New York District	New York F.C.	H	postponed		
11 December 1921	Third Round; Eastern Division; Northern and Southern New York District	New York F.C.	H	5-3	McGuire, McKenna, Hosie, Sweeney (2)	
26 December 1921	Fourth Round; Eastern Division; New York, New Jersey and Pennsylvania District	Philadelphia F.C.	A	4-1	McKenna (2), Smith, Ratican	
12 February 1922	Semifinals; Eastern Division; New York-New Jersey District	Harrison S.C.	A	1-0	Ratican	3,000
25 February 1922	Final; Eastern Division	Abbot Worsted F.C.	at Fall River, Mass.	2-1	Ratican (2)	
19 March 1922	Final	Scullin Steel F.C.	at High School Field, St. Louis, Mo.	2-3	McGuire (2)	8,000

== Southern New York State Football Association Cup ==
Date	Round	Opponents	H/A	Result F–A	Scorers	Attendance
12 March 1922	Second Round	Greenpoint F.C.	H	5-2	McKenna (2), Smith, Sweeney (2)	
30 April 1922	Final	New York F.C.	A	0-3		50,000

== Notes and references ==
Bibliography

- Jose, Colin (1998). The American Soccer League: The Golden Years of American Soccer 1921-1931. Lanham, Maryland: Scarecrow Press. ISBN 978-0810834293.
- Cahill, Thomas W., ed. (1921). Spalding's Official "Soccer" Football Guide 1921-22. Spalding's "Red Cover" Series of Athletic Handbooks, No. 55R. New York: American Sports Publishing Company.
- Cahill, Thomas W., ed. (1922). Spalding's Official "Soccer" Football Guide 1922-23. Spalding's "Red Cover" Series of Athletic Handbooks, No. 55R. New York: American Sports Publishing Company.

Footnotes
