= Fred Pepper =

English footballer (1887–1950)

Personal information
- Full name: Frederick Pepper
- Date of birth: 1887
- Place of birth: Netherfield, Nottinghamshire, England
- Date of death: 12 June 1950 (aged 62–63)
- Place of death: Lehigh Valley, Pennsylvania, United States
- Position: Inside forward

Senior career*
Years	Team	Apps	(Gls)
1908–1912	Notts County	5	
1913–1914	Hamilton Lancashire		
1914–1920	Bethlehem Steel		
1920–1921	Tebo Yacht Basin		
1921–1922	Harrison S.C.	21	(3)
1922–1923	Fall River	13	(1)
1923–1924	New York Giants	6	(3)
- * Club domestic league appearances and goals

Frederick "Chiddy" (Note: English newspapers, recounting his original playing career at Notts County, referred to him as "Chiddy"; American sources frequently nicknamed him "Pep".) Pepper (1887 – 12 June 1950) was an English footballer who played as an inside forward. Born in Netherfield, Nottinghamshire, Pepper received a basic education before finding vocation as a fireman on the local railway. Joining Notts County F.C. in 1908 aged 21, he found little success playing in the English Football League and subsequently emigrated to Canada in 1913. Settling in Hamilton, Ontario, Pepper was scouted by industrialist Charles M. Schwab from local team Hamilton Lancashire and joined his Bethlehem Steel F.C. in 1914, an important club in the infancy of organized association football in the United States.

Pepper saw much success in playing for Bethlehem; after unimpressive beginnings, he went on to play a major role in securing many titles for the side, including four American Cups, three National Challenge Cups and two National Association Football League triumphs. Becoming captain for the 1918 and 1919 campaigns, success continued until his abrupt departure in 1920. Pepper's career became somewhat volatile, signing for four amateur teams within the space of four years; all of which failed to match his record at Bethlehem. Retirement saw him remain prominent in local sporting and steel-working culture in Lehigh Valley, Pennsylvania, in-time becoming a corn merchant until his death in 1950.

== Early life ==
Frederick Pepper was born in 1887, one of nine children in Netherfield, Nottinghamshire, a small town prospering from the instalment of the Ambergate, Nottingham, Boston and Eastern Junction Railway. He was educated at the local Ashwell Street Board School, which grew into the Chandos Street School in 1906, eventually amalgamating in 1973 to form Carlton le Willows School. Customarily leaving school at 14, Frederick found employment with London and North Eastern Railway as a fireman; it was around this time he found he had an aptitude for association football, and began playing professionally in 1908 aged 21.

== Playing career ==
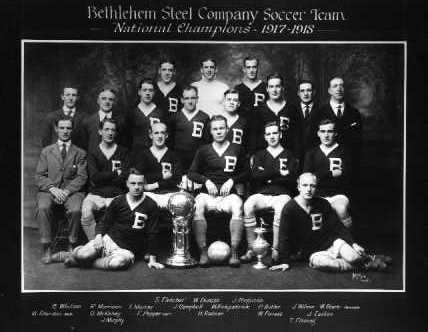
Pepper, who captained Bethlehem Steel in their victory of the 1917–18 National Challenge Cup, is pictured third from the left on the front row

Joining in the 1908–09 campaign, Pepper briefly played with Notts County F.C. in The Football League; his lack of appearances is noted, however, only making 5 total appearances in the 1911–12 season, it would be his last at the club. With his wife, Pepper boarded the RMS Laconia in 1913 and set sail for North America, settling in Hamilton, Ontario. Playing for club Hamilton Lancashire, Pepper became Canada's Western Football Association League's leading scorer and helped secure the team's victory of the 1913 Ontario Cup alongside recurring teammate Sam Fletcher. By the following year, Frederick had attracted the attention of industrialist Charles M. Schwab, who was seeking to recruit international talent for his Bethlehem Steel F.C. Signing for the club and debuting on 23 November 1914, Pepper simultaneously worked for the associated steelworks whilst residing in Bethlehem, Pennsylvania.

Appearances in the 1914–15 campaign, akin to his time at Notts County, were sporadic in nature, seeing time in only six games and scoring a mere three goals. However, Pepper, a talented inside forward, saw more success in the following season, participating in the final of the 1914–15 National Challenge Cup, a 3–1 victory over Brooklyn Celtic. Success for Frederick continued into 1916, when Bethlehem Steel won the year's American Cup in a 3–0 victory over the Kearny Scots; they further defeated the Fall River Rovers 1–0 to the 1915–16 National Challenge Cup, retaining their title. Despite coming runners-up in the 1916–17 Cup in a reversed 1–0 defeat to the Fall River Rovers, Bethlehem Steel went on to win the final of the 1917 American Cup against West Hudson A.A. in a dramatic 7–0 triumph, in which Pepper scored twice. The 1917–18 National Challenge Cup against the Fall River Rovers was subsequently won by Bethlehem Steel on 19 May after an initial match ran out of extra time at 2–2 on the 4th of that month; Pepper scored the second goal of a 3–0 victory.

Joining the National Association Football League in 1917, the top flight of American association football, Pepper captained Bethlehem Steel to title wins in both the 1918-19 and 1919-20 campaigns, as well as to extending their title of the American Cup, winning the 1918 event 1–0 over Babcock & Wilcox and the 1919 trophy in a 2–0 victory over Paterson; the 1918–19 National Challenge Cup final was won against the same team by the same margin. Despite signing for the club's 1920–21 season, Frederick never made a first-team roster, causing him to leave the club after six successful seasons in which Bethlehem held an impressive record of 149 wins, seven losses, 718 goals for with just 120 against.

Moving to Brooklyn, New York in December 1920, Pepper joined amateur Tebo Yacht Basin F.C., where his successful reputation quickly earned him the captaincy of the team. He led the likes of Jimmy Gallagher, who represented the United States in both the 1930 and 1934 FIFA World Cup finals. He left after just one season when the National Association Football League amalgamated with the Southern New England Soccer League to form the American Soccer League; these changes led to the merger of Tebo Yacht Basin and Brooklyn Robins Dry Dock into Todd Shipyards, the parent corporation of both the Tebo and Robins companies. Refusing to join the newly formed club, Frederick instead played for Harrison S.C., based in Harrison, New Jersey, making 21 appearances and scoring three goals. He would go on to repeat similarly short spells of a single season, firstly at the Fall River in Fall River, Massachusetts, winning 13 caps and scoring a single goal in the 1922-23 campaign; as well as at the New York Giants, the last signing of his career, making six appearances and scoring thrice in the 1923–1924 season.

== Later life ==
Pepper settled with his wife in Lehigh Valley, Pennsylvania in retirement, home to Bethlehem Steel and its eponymous football club. Remaining prominent in the local area's sporting culture, he served as a referee in the Pennsylvania Eastern League, eventually becoming president of the Lehigh Valley Soccer Referees Association. Frederick also held the positions of vice-president at the Eastern Pennsylvania District Soccer Association and as treasurer of the Lehigh Valley Soccer League; he disassociated with the latter in August 1929 due to disagreements over league policy. This prompted regret among the local media, which subsequently described him as "one of the greatest halfbacks that ever played in this country".

Maintaining certain friendships following his playing days, Pepper liaised with the likes of Bethlehem manager William Sheridan, and teammates Johnny Rollo and Robert Morrison well into the 1940s; the latter, according to Morrison's nephew, identified Pepper by his "ugly little mug". Alike his time in England, Frederick was also involved in trade union business, becoming a leading member of the Steel Workers Organizing Committee (SWOC) by at least 1937; he is known to have recruited successfully, given that Bethlehem suffered particular economic depravity during the Great Depression, an event that affected public attendance to matches throughout the 1920s. Following this, he worked as a self-employed corn merchant until his death on June 12, 1950; he was survived by his 20-year old adoptive daughter, his wife died several years before him.
