= 1922–23 Paterson F.C. season =

Paterson F.C.
1922–23 season
- Owner: Adolph Buslik
- Manager: Adolph Buslik
- Stadium: Olympic Park
- American Soccer League: 5th
- National Challenge Cup: Winners
- American Cup: Semifinals
- New Jersey State Football Association Cup: Winners
- Top goalscorer: Frank McKenna (14)
- Biggest win: 6 goals 6-0 vs. Hartford Rovers (7 January 1923)
- Biggest defeat: 3 goals 0-3 at New York S.C. (3 December 1922); 2-5 at J. & P. Coats F.C. (19 May 1923)

The 1922–23 Paterson F.C. season was the first season for the club in the American Soccer League. Prior to the season, Adolph Buslik, a wealthy fur merchant, purchased the club as well as the former Falco F.C. franchise in the American Soccer League. The club finished the season in 5th place.

After the season, Buslik moved the franchise to New York and renamed it the National Giants Soccer Club.

== American Soccer League ==
Date	Opponents	H/A	Result F–A	Scorers	Attendance
8 October 1922	Harrison S.C.	A	3-1	Herd, Duggan, Sweeney	
21 October 1922	Philadelphia F.C.	A	0-0		
22 October 1922	Bethlehem Steel F.C.	H	1-2	Hemingsley	
29 October 1922	J. & P. Coats F.C.	H	2-1	Sweeney, McKenna	
5 November 1922	Philadelphia F.C.	H	5-1	Duggan, Hemingsley, Sweeney, Murray, McKenna	
18 November 1922	J. & P. Coats F.C.	A	2-3	Duggan, McKenna	
19 November 1922	Fall River F.C.	A	0-0		
3 December 1922	New York S.C.	A	0-3		
10 December 1922	New York S.C.	A	6-3	Duggan (2), Murray, McKenna (3)	
16 December 1922	Bethlehem Steel F.C.	A	2-2	Duggan, McKenna	
13 January 1923	Bethlehem Steel F.C.	A	1-2	McKenna	
4 February 1923	Fall River F.C.	A	2-0	McKenna (2)	
4 March 1923	Harrison S.C.	H	3-0	Irvine, McKenna (2)	
8 April 1923	Fall River F.C.	H	2-0	Duggan, McKenna	
15 April 1923	Brooklyn Wanderers F.C.	H	2-1	McGuire, Smith	
22 April 1923	Brooklyn Wanderers F.C.	H	2-2	Fryer, McKenna	
6 May 1923	Bethlehem Steel F.C.	H	3-2	Duggan (2), Hemingsley	3,000
19 May 1923	J. & P. Coats F.C.	A	2-5	Murray (2)	
20 May 1923	Fall River F.C.	A	0-1		
3 June 1923	J. & P. Coats F.C.	H	0-2		

Pos	Club	Pld	W	D	L	GF	GA	GD	Pts
1	J. & P. Coats F.C.	28	21	2	5	68	30	+38	44
2	Bethlehem Steel F.C.	28	18	6	4	59	26	+33	42
3	Fall River F.C.	28	15	5	8	53	36	+17	35
4	New York S.C.	23	10	4	9	53	42	+11	24
5	Paterson F.C.	20	9	4	7	38	31	+7	22
6	Brooklyn Wanderers F.C.	25	5	5	15	24	52	-28	15
7	Harrison S.C.	23	4	2	17	26	56	-30	10
8	Philadelphia F.C.	25	3	2	20	24	72	-48	8

Pld = Matches played; W = Matches won; D = Matches drawn; L = Matches lost; GF = Goals for; GA = Goals against; Pts = Points

== National Challenge Cup ==
Date	Round	Opponents	H/A	Result F–A	Scorers	Attendance
15 October 1922	First Round; Eastern Division; New Jersey District	Harrison S.C.	H	forfeit win		
5 November 1922	Second Round; Eastern Division; New Jersey District	Entre Nous F.C.	A	forfeit win		
26 November 1922	Third Round; Eastern Division; New York, New Jersey and Eastern Pennsylvania District	American A.A. F.C.	A	2-0		
7 January 1923	Fourth Round; Eastern Division; New York, New Jersey, Eastern Pennsylvania and Connecticut District	Hartford Rovers	H	6-0	Fryer (2), McKenna (4)	
11 March 1923	Semifinals; Eastern Division; New York and New Jersey District	Paterson F.C.	at Harrison, N.J.	0-0		
18 March 1923	Semifinals; Eastern Division; New York and New Jersey District (replay)	Paterson F.C.	at Harrison, N.J.	4-1	Fryer, Duggan (2), Irvine	
25 March 1923	Final; Eastern Division	J. & P. Coats F.C.	at Harrison Oval	3-2	Duggan (2), Irvine	
1 April 1923	Final	Scullin Steel F.C.	at Harrison Field	2-2	Duggan, Hemingsley	15,000
1 April 1923	Final (replay)	Scullin Steel F.C.	at Harrison Field	forfeit win (Note: Scullin Steel was unable to field a complete team for the scheduled replay due to players who were obliged to report for baseball training camp and others who were injured.)		

== Notes and references ==
Bibliography

- Jose, Colin (1998). The American Soccer League: The Golden Years of American Soccer 1921-1931. Lanham, Maryland: Scarecrow Press. ISBN 978-0810834293.
- Cahill, Thomas W., ed. (1922). Spalding's Official "Soccer" Football Guide 1922-23. Spalding's "Red Cover" Series of Athletic Handbooks, No. 55R. New York: American Sports Publishing Company.
- Cahill, Thomas W., ed. (1923). Spalding's Official "Soccer" Football Guide 1923-24. Spalding's "Red Cover" Series of Athletic Handbooks, No. 55R. New York: American Sports Publishing Company.

Footnotes
