= 1921–22 Harrison S.C. season =

Harrison S.C.
1921-22 season
- Stadium: Harrison Field
- American Soccer League: 4th
- National Challenge Cup: Semifinals; Eastern Division; New York-New Jersey District
- New Jersey State Cup: Winners
- Top goalscorer: John Heminsley (16)
- Biggest win: 7 goals 7-0 vs. Falco F.C. (26 December 1921)
- Biggest defeat: 3 goals 0-3 at Philadelphia F.C. (13 November 1921); 2-5 at New York F.C. (2 February 1922); 3-6 at Philadelphia F.C. 11 March 1922

The 1921–22 Harrison S.C. season was the club's first season in the American Soccer League and the inaugural season of the league. The club was previously known as Erie A.A. and played the prior year in the National Association Foot Ball League (Note: Erie A.A. fielded a separate club in the 1921-22 West Hudson Amateur League season.). Harrison S.C. finished 4th in the league.

== American Soccer League ==
| Date | Opponents | H/A | Result F–A | Scorers | Attendance |
|---|---|---|---|---|---|
| 18 September 1921 | New York F.C. | A | 2-2 | Heminsley (2) | |
| 25 September 1921 | Todd Shipyards F.C. | A | 2-3 | Heminsley, Shaw | |
| 1 October 1921 | Fall River F.C. | A | 1-1 | Brierley | |
| 8 October 1921 | Falco F.C. | A | 3-1 | Blakey, Ford, Shaw | |
| 29 October 1921 | Philadelphia F.C. | A | 1-3 | Shaw | |
| 30 October 1921 | J. & P. Coats F.C. | H | 1-1 | Ford | |
| 13 November 1921 | Philadelphia F.C. | H | 0-3 | | |
| 19 November 1921 | J. & P. Coats F.C. | A | 1-1 | Harry Ratican | |
| 20 November 1921 | Todd Shipyards F.C. | H | 0-2 | | |
| 18 December 1921 | Fall River F.C. | H | 5-1 | Post, Heminsley (2), Ford, Brown | 2,500 |
| 26 December 1921 | Falco F.C. | H | 7-0 | Pepper, Heminsley (3), Brown (2), Wilson | |
| 31 December 1921 | Fall River F.C. | A | 2-0 | Wilson, Bleich | |
| 2 January 1922 | J. & P. Coats F.C. | A | 2-2 | Heminsley, Ford | |
| 8 January 1922 | New York F.C. | H | 1-1 | Wilson | |
| 22 January 1922 | Todd Shipyards F.C. | H | 3-2 | Blakey, Heminsley, Wilson | |
| 5 February 1922 | New York F.C. | A | 2-5 | Pepper, Heminsley | |
| 28 February 1922 | J. & P. Coats F.C. | H | 2-1 | Heminsley (2) | |
| 5 March 1922 | New York F.C. | A | 1-3 | Ford | |
| 11 March 1922 | Philadelphia F.C. | A | 3-6 | Stark, Heminsley, Brown | |
| 12 March 1922 | Philadelphia F.C. | H | 2-2 | Heminsley, Brown | |
| 18 March 1922 | Falco F.C. | A | 2-1 | Pepper, Butterworth | |
| 25 March 1922 | Fall River F.C. | H | 1-0 | Brown | |
| 16 April 1922 | Todd Shipyards F.C. | A | 1-3 | Heminsley | |

| Pos | Club | Pld | W | D | L | GF | GA | GD | Pts |
|---|---|---|---|---|---|---|---|---|---|
| 1 | Philadelphia F.C. | 24 | 17 | 4 | 3 | 72 | 36 | +36 | 38 |
| 2 | New York F.C. | 24 | 14 | 5 | 5 | 59 | 33 | +26 | 33 |
| 3 | Todd Shipyards F.C. | 24 | 12 | 5 | 7 | 56 | 37 | +19 | 29 |
| 4 | Harrison S.C. | 24 | 8 | 7 | 8 | 45 | 44 | +1 | 23 |
| 5 | J. & P. Coats F.C. | 23 | 9 | 5 | 9 | 34 | 40 | -6 | 23 |
| 6 | Fall River F.C. | 24 | 5 | 1 | 18 | 28 | 57 | -29 | 11 |
| 7 | Falco F.C. | 22 | 2 | 3 | 17 | 17 | 64 | -47 | 7 |
| n/a | Celtic F.C. | 5 | 0 | 0 | 5 | 5 | 24 | -19 | 0 |

Pld = Matches played; W = Matches won; D = Matches drawn; L = Matches lost; GF = Goals for; GA = Goals against; Pts = Points

== National Challenge Cup ==
| Date | Round | Opponents | H/A | Result F–A | Scorers | Attendance |
|---|---|---|---|---|---|---|
| 23 October 1921 | First Round; Eastern Division; New Jersey District | Napier F.C. | H | 4-0 | Brierley, Heminsley | |
| 6 November 1921 | Second Round; Eastern Division; New Jersey District | Celtic F.C. | A | 3-1 | Jimmy McGhee (2), Wilson | |
| 11 December 1921 (Note: Game postponed from November 27 and December 4.) | Third Round; Eastern Division; New Jersey District | Antler F.C. | H | 5-0 | | |
| 24 December 1921 | Fourth Round; Eastern Division; New York, New Jersey and Pennsylvania District | Viking F.C. | H | 6-2 | Heminsley, Brown | |
| 12 February 1922 | Semifinals; Eastern Division; New York-New Jersey District | Todd Shipyards F.C. | H | 0-1 | | 3,000 |

== New Jersey State Cup ==
| Date | Round | Opponents | H/A | Result F–A | Scorers | Attendance |
|---|---|---|---|---|---|---|
| | First Round | | | bye | | |
| | Second Round | | | bye | | |
| March 19 | Third Round | Entre Nous F.C. | ? | 6-1 | | |
| April 2 | Fourth Round | Royal Oak F.C. | ? | 7-1 | | |
| May 7 | Semifinals | Hudson F.C. | ? | 7-1 | | |
| May 14 | Final | Antler F.C. | ? | 2-0 | | |

== Notes and references ==
Bibliography

- Jose, Colin (1998). The American Soccer League: The Golden Years of American Soccer 1921-1931. Lanham, Maryland: Scarecrow Press. ISBN 978-0810834293.
- Cahill, Thomas W., ed. (1921). Spalding's Official "Soccer" Football Guide 1921-22. Spalding's "Red Cover" Series of Athletic Handbooks, No. 55R. New York: American Sports Publishing Company.
- Cahill, Thomas W., ed. (1922). Spalding's Official "Soccer" Football Guide 1922-23. Spalding's "Red Cover" Series of Athletic Handbooks, No. 55R. New York: American Sports Publishing Company.

Notes

Footnotes
