= 1923–24 Newark F.C. season =

Newark F.C.
1923–24 season
- Manager: Brown
- Stadium: Meadowbrook Oval
- American Soccer League: 8th
- National Challenge Cup: Semifinals; Eastern Division
- American Cup: Second Round
- Top goalscorer: Davey Brown (5)
- Biggest win: 4 goals 4–0 vs. Brooklyn Wanderers F.C. (6 January 1924)
- Biggest defeat: 4 goals three games

The 1923–24 Newark F.C. season was the third season for the club in the American Soccer League but its first season in Newark after playing the previous season as Harrison S.C. Following the 1922–23 season, the team moved from Harrison, New Jersey to Newark. The club finished the season in 8th place.

== American Soccer League ==
Date	Opponents	H/A	Result F–A	Scorers	Attendance
7 October 1923	New York S.C.	A	0–2		
14 October 1923	Brooklyn Wanderers F.C.	A	1–2	Green	1,000
27 October 1923	J. & P. Coats F.C.	A	2–5	Murray, Stephens	
28 October 1923	Fall River F.C.	A	0–2		
4 November 1923	National Giants F.C.	H	1–0	Hemingsley	
8 December 1923	Bethlehem Steel F.C.	A	0–2		
9 December 1923	Bethlehem Steel F.C.	H	3–4	Lawther (3)	
16 December 1923	New York S.C.	H	1–3	Brown	
5 January 1924	Philadelphia F.C.	A	0–1		
6 January 1924	Brooklyn Wanderers F.C.	H	4–0	McArthur, Brown (3)	
13 January 1924	New York S.C.	H	2–3	Best (2)	
27 January 1924	Philadelphia F.C.	H	1–2	Best	
22 February 1924	Brooklyn Wanderers F.C.	A	cancelled (Note: Game cancelled due to condition of grounds.)		
1 March 1924	Bethlehem Steel F.C.	A	0–3		
16 March 1924	Fall River F.C.	H	0–4		
23 March 1924	Brooklyn Wanderers F.C.	H	1–0	Hemingsley	
5 April 1924	J. & P. Coats F.C.	A	0–4		
6 April 1924	Fall River F.C.	A	0–3		
13 April 1924	New York S.C.	A	0–1		
19 April 1924	Philadelphia F.C.	A	1–2	Hemingsley	
20 April 1924	Fall River F.C.	A	0–3		
4 May 1924	National Giants F.C.	H	0–1		
25 May 1924	Bethlehem Steel F.C.	H	2–4	McArthur, Brown	
1 June 1924	National Giants F.C.	A	2–2	Green, Best	

Pos	Club	Pld	W	D	L	GF	GA	GD	Pts
1	Fall River F.C.	27	19	6	2	59	19	+40	44
2	Bethlehem Steel F.C.	28	18	4	6	63	33	+30	40
3	New York S.C.	28	15	8	5	67	39	+28	38
4	J. & P. Coats F.C.	25	11	5	9	59	54	+5	27
5	Brooklyn Wanderers F.C.	27	9	5	13	47	57	−10	23
6	National Giants F.C.	26	6	6	14	36	64	−28	18
7	Philadelphia F.C.	26	5	3	18	30	64	−34	13
8	Newark F.C.	23	3	1	19	20	53	-33	7

Pld = Matches played; W = Matches won; D = Matches drawn; L = Matches lost; GF = Goals for; GA = Goals against; Pts = Points

== National Challenge Cup ==
Date	Round	Opponents	H/A	Result F–A	Scorers	Attendance
???	First Round; Eastern Division; New Jersey District	Ryerson F.C.	H	???		
???	Second Round; Eastern Division; New Jersey District	???	???	???		
2 December 1923	Third Round; Eastern Division; New Jersey District	Trenton British War Veterans	H	3–2	Lawther (2), Hemingsley	
25 December 1923	Fourth Round; Eastern Division	National Giants F.C.	A	5–2	McArthur, Lawther, Hemingsley, Brown (2)	2,000
26 January 1924	Semifinals; Eastern Division	Bethlehem Steel F.C.	at National League Park	1–1 (aet)	Green	
2 February 1924	Semifinals; Eastern Division (replay)	Bethlehem Steel F.C.	at National League Park	0–4		

== American Football Association Cup ==
Date	Round	Opponents	H/A	Result F–A	Scorers	Attendance
20 January 1924	Second Round	Brooklyn Wanderers F.C.	A	2–4	Hemingsley, Bleich	2,000

== Notes and references ==
Bibliography

- Jose, Colin (1998). The American Soccer League: The Golden Years of American Soccer 1921–1931. Lanham, Maryland: Scarecrow Press. ISBN 978-0810834293.
- Cahill, Thomas W., ed. (1923). Spalding's Official "Soccer" Football Guide 1923-24. Spalding's "Red Cover" Series of Athletic Handbooks, No. 55R. New York: American Sports Publishing Company.

Footnotes
