= Brooklyn Morse Dry Dock =

- Ground: Morse Oval
- League: New York State League

The Brooklyn Morse Dry Dock were an early 20th-century American soccer team sponsored by the Morse Dry Dock and Repair Company (Morse D.D.&R.). The team played its home games at Morse Oval in South Brooklyn.

Morse played the 1917–1918 season in the Metropolitan Division of the New York State League.

In 1918, Morse signed seven players from the Fall River Rovers. Using this infusion of talent, the team went to the quarterfinals of the American Cup and the semifinals of the National Challenge Cup. That year is won the Southern New York State Association Cup, In the fall of 1919, the team entered the professional National Association Football League, finishing sixth in a ten team division.

== Year-by-year ==
Year	League	Standing	American Cup	National Cup
1917/18	MDJFL (New York)	?	?	?
1918/19	NYCAL	?	Quarterfinals	Semifinals
1919/20	NAFBL	3rd	Champion	Semifinal
1920/21	NAFBL	3rd	Champion	Champion
