= 1922–23 Harrison S.C. season =

Harrison S.C.
1922–23 season
- Stadium: Harrison Field
- American Soccer League: 7th
- National Challenge Cup: First Round; Eastern Division; New Jersey Division
- New Jersey State Football Association Cup: Runners-up
- Top goalscorer: Davey Brown (6)
- Biggest win: 2 goals 4 matches
- Biggest defeat: 5 goals 1-6 at J. & P. Coats F.C. (21 April 1923)

The 1922–23 Harrison S.C. season was the second season for the club in the American Soccer League. The club finished the season in 7th place.

In the off-season, the club moved and became Newark F.C.

== American Soccer League ==
Date	Opponents	H/A	Result F–A	Scorers	Attendance
8 October 1922	Paterson F.C.	H	1-3	McCartin	
14 October 1922	Philadelphia F.C.	H	1-3	Brown	
15 October 1922	Philadelphia F.C.	A	3-4	Fletcher, Hartnett, Brown	
29 October 1922	Fall River F.C.	H	1-2	J. Ingram	
11 November 1922	J. & P. Coats F.C.	A	0-0		
12 November 1922	Fall River F.C.	A	1-2	Brown	
19 November 1922	Bethlehem Steel F.C.	H	0-3		
2 December 1922	Bethlehem Steel F.C.	A	0-3		
3 December 1922	Brooklyn Wanderers F.C.	H	2-0	Rhody, Brown	
10 December 1922	Brooklyn Wanderers F.C.	A	4-2	J. Ingram, Rhody, Brown, Hartnett	
24 December 1922	Fall River F.C.	A	2-5	Hartnett, J. Ingram	
4 February 1923	New York S.C.	A	0-4		
4 March 1923	Paterson F.C.	A	0-3		
25 March 1923	Brooklyn Wanderers F.C.	H	1-2	Brown	
31 March 1923	Philadelphia F.C.	A	3-1	Ford, Rhody, Scott	
8 April 1923	J. & P. Coats F.C.	H	0-1		
15 April 1923	Bethlehem Steel F.C.	H	1-2	T. Ingram	
21 April 1923	J. & P. Coats F.C.	A	1-6	Campbell	
22 April 1923	Fall River F.C.	A	1-3	T. Ingram	
28 April 1923	Bethlehem Steel F.C.	A	0-3		
29 April 1923	New York S.C.	A	3-1	J. Ingram (2), T. Ingram	
6 May 1923	Brooklyn Wanderers F.C.	A	0-0		
13 May 1923	J. & P. Coats F.C.	A	1-3	T. Ingram	

Pos	Club	Pld	W	D	L	GF	GA	GD	Pts
1	J. & P. Coats F.C.	28	21	2	5	68	30	+38	44
2	Bethlehem Steel F.C.	28	18	6	4	59	26	+33	42
3	Fall River F.C.	28	15	5	8	53	36	+17	35
4	New York S.C.	23	10	4	9	53	42	+11	24
5	Paterson F.C.	20	9	4	7	38	31	+7	22
6	Brooklyn Wanderers F.C.	25	5	5	15	24	52	-28	15
7	Harrison S.C.	23	4	2	17	26	56	-30	10
8	Philadelphia F.C.	25	3	2	20	24	72	-48	8

Pld = Matches played; W = Matches won; D = Matches drawn; L = Matches lost; GF = Goals for; GA = Goals against; Pts = Points

== National Challenge Cup ==
Date	Round	Opponents	H/A	Result F–A	Scorers	Attendance
15 October 1922	First Round; Eastern Division; New Jersey District	Paterson F.C.	A	forfeit loss		

== Notes and references ==
Bibliography

- Jose, Colin (1998). The American Soccer League: The Golden Years of American Soccer 1921-1931. Lanham, Maryland: Scarecrow Press. ISBN 978-0810834293.
- Cahill, Thomas W., ed. (1922). Spalding's Official "Soccer" Football Guide 1922-23. Spalding's "Red Cover" Series of Athletic Handbooks, No. 55R. New York: American Sports Publishing Company.
- Cahill, Thomas W., ed. (1923). Spalding's Official "Soccer" Football Guide 1923-24. Spalding's "Red Cover" Series of Athletic Handbooks, No. 55R. New York: American Sports Publishing Company.

Footnotes
