= Frank McKenna (Scottish footballer) =

Scottish footballer

Personal information
- Place of birth: Scotland
- Position: Wing forward

Senior career*
Years	Team	Apps	(Gls)
- Vale of Leven
1920	Bethlehem Steel		
1920–1921	Robins Dry Dock		
1921–1922	Todd Shipyards	20	(15)
1922–1923	Paterson	14	(14)
1923–1926	Fall River	74	(20)
1926–1927	Indiana Flooring	31	(8)
1927–1928	→ New York Nationals	20	(2)
1928	Fall River	2	(0)
1928	Providence	3	(0)
1928–1929	J&P Coats	16	(2)
- * Club domestic league appearances and goals

Frank McKenna was a Scottish football wing forward who began his career in Scotland before playing eight seasons in the American Soccer League.

McKenna began his career with Vale of Leven F.C. in the Scottish Football League Second Division. In the spring of 1919, he briefly joined Bethlehem Steel of the National Association Football League (NAFBL) after the completion of the 1918–1919 season. However, he left the team before the start of the 1919–1920 season. In May 1920, he rejoined Bethlehem Steel for the last few games of the season. He then moved to Brooklyn Robins Dry Dock for the 1920–1921 season. The move to Robins paid off when Dry Dock took the 1921 National Challenge Cup title. In 1921, several teams from the NAFBL merged with teams from the Southern New England Soccer League to form the first American Soccer League. While Robins intended to move to the new league, the parent corporation, Todd Shipyards consolidated Robins with another of the company's teams, Tebo Yacht Basin F.C., to form the Todd Shipyards team. Therefore, McKenna spent the 1921–1922 season with Todd. McKenna went to his second National Challenge Cup, but was on the losing side this time. Following that loss, the company withdrew the team from the league and McKenna moved to Paterson where he scored a goal a game in both league and cup play. Once again, he went to the National Challenge Cup, winning his second title as he assisted on John Hemingsley tying goal in the 84th minute. McKenna finished the season with the Fall River, one of the perennial powers in the ASL. During his three seasons in Fall River, McKenna won three league titles and yet another National Challenge Cup. In 1925, he began the season with the 'Marksmen' but finished it with Indiana Flooring. In 1927, Indiana Flooring was renamed the New York Nationals. McKenna played sixteen games with the Nationals, then moved back to the 'Marksmen' for two games before moving to Providence for three games. He finished his ASL career with J&P Coats in 1928–1929.
