= Kearny Federal Ship Athletic Association Soccer Club =

American soccer team

Kearny Federal Ship Athletic Association Soccer Club (better known as Federal Ship F.C.) was a U.S. soccer team which competed for two seasons in the National Association Football League. They played at Clark's Athletic Field in Kearny, New Jersey, with a capacity of at least 3,000.

== History ==
Federal Ship F.C. was the company team for the Federal Ship Company of Kearny, New Jersey. The team played in New Jersey leagues, only coming to national prominence when it joined the National Association Football League for the 1919-20 season. Federal Ship spent two seasons in the NAFBL. When the NAFBL folded in 1921 with the establishment of the American Soccer League, Federal Ship withdrew from professional competition.

== Year-by-year ==
Year	League	Reg. season	American Cup	National Challenge Cup
1918/19	?	?	Quarterfinals	Third round
1919/20	NAFBL	8th	Quarterfinals	Third round
1920/21	NAFBL	4th	?	Third round

== Honors ==
New Jersey State Challenge Cup

- Winner (1): 1921
- Runner Up (1): 1919
