= George McKelvey (soccer) =

Scottish-American soccer player

Personal information
- Place of birth: Scotland
- Positions: Right back; right half

Senior career*
Years	Team	Apps	(Gls)
1913–1920	Bethlehem Steel		
1921	Robins Dry Dock		
1921–1922	Todd Shipyards	20	(7)
1922–1923	New York Field Club	5	(2)
1924–1925	Philadelphia Field Club	2	(0)
- * Club domestic league appearances and goals

George McKelvey, also spelled McKelvie, (born Scotland) was a Scottish-American soccer player who spent his entire professional career in the United States.

== Playing career ==
The first record of McKelvey playing professionally comes in 1913 when he is listed with Bethlehem Steel of the amateur Allied American Football Association. He remained with Bethlehem until 1921, when he scored a goal for Brooklyn Robins Dry Dock in the team's 4–2 victory over St. Louis Scullin Steel F.C. in the 1921 National Challenge Cup. During his years with Bethlehem Steel, McKelvey played both right half and right fullback, at times filling in on the front line as right wing when injuries plagued the team. On April 19, 1919, he scored the first Bethlehem goal in its 2–0 victory over Paterson F.C. in the 1919 National Challenge Cup. In addition to the two cups mentioned, McKelvey was part of the winning team in the 1915, 1916, and 1918 National Challenge Cups. He also won five American Cup titles with Bethlehem during this period. In 1921, Todd Shipyards, owner of Tebo Yacht Basin and Robins Dry Dock, merged the teams sponsored by these companies into one club, Todd Shipyards and entered it into the newly established American Soccer League. McKelvey spent one season with Todd Shipyards which folded in 1922. He then moved to New York Field Club for the 1922–1923 season, but saw time in only five games. He is not listed with any ASL teams in 1923–1924, but played two games with Philadelphia Field Club during the 1924–1925 season.

== Possible other teams ==
One newspaper article from 1918 mentions McKelvey as having played for Disston A.A., but no records exist to substantiate this claim. Another article from 1921 claims McKelvey played for Tebo Yacht Basin F.C. before moving to Todd Shipyards, but the reporter may have been confused between the two teams which merged to form Todd Shipyards.
