= Paddy Butler =

American soccer player

Personal information
- Place of birth: Belfast, Ireland
- Positions: Outside forward; half back

Senior career*
Years	Team	Apps	(Gls)
1912–1913	Hollywood Inn		
1913–1914	Brooklyn Celtic		
1914–1915	Brooklyn Field Club		
1915–1919	Bethlehem Steel		
1919–1920	Philadelphia Merchant Ship		
1920–1921	Goodrich		
1921–1922	Fall River United	16	(5)
- * Club domestic league appearances and goals

Patrick Butler was an Irish soccer player who appears to have spent his entire career in the U.S. leagues. He was a member of the Bethlehem Steel teams which won the 1916 National Challenge Cup and the 1917 and 1919 American Cup Butler began his career on the front line, playing both inside and outside forward on both sides of the field. He ended his career at the right half back position.

In the fall of 1913, Brooklyn Celtic of the New York Amateur Association Football League signed Butler and several other top players. This produced a team which won both the league title and the Southern New York State Foot Ball Association Cup. In May 1914, Butler and his teammates fell to Brooklyn Field Club in the final of the 1914 National Challenge Cup. He then moved to Brooklyn Field Club for the 1914–15 National Association Foot Ball League season. In 1915, he signed the Bethlehem Steel, then competing in the American Soccer League of Philadelphia. On October 25, 1915, the Bethlehem Globe mentioned "Butler, a new man being given a try-out at inside right as a partner to Dean." That season, Butler and his teammates won the 1916 National Challenge Cup. On May 13, 1917, Butler scored a goal in Bethlehem's 7–0 defeat of West Hudson A.A. in the 1917 American Cup. It was considered "the best goal of the game." That fall, Bethlehem entered the National Association Football League, winning the league title in 1919. Bethlehem took the double that season when they defeated Paterson F.C. to win the 1919 American Cup title. In that game, a 2–0 victory, Butler scored the first goal in the eleventh minute. In the summer of 1919, he moved to the Philadelphia Merchant Ship team. Merchant Ship folded at the end of the season and he played for Goodrich in Akron, Ohio from 1920 to 1921. In 1921, the American Soccer League replaced the NAFBL as the top U.S.league. Butler spent one season in the new league playing for Fall River United.
