= Robert Hosie =

Scottish footballer

Personal information
- Place of birth: Scotland
- Position: Inside forward

Senior career*
Years	Team	Apps	(Gls)
- Vale of Leven
1908–1915	Third Lanark	96	(21)
1913–1914	→ St Bernard's	18	(6)
1914–1915	→ Clydebank (loan)	19	(2)
1920–1921	Robins Dry Dock	6	(4)
1921–1922	Todd Shipyards	12	(1)
1922–1923	Paterson	1	(0)
1923–1924	New York Field Club	10	(2)
1924–1926	Brooklyn Wanderers	38	(5)
1926	New York Giants	6	(0)
- * Club domestic league appearances and goals

Robert Hosie was a Scottish soccer inside forward who began his career in Scotland before moving to the United States. In the U.S., he played one season in the National Association Football League and five in the American Soccer League.

In October 1920, Hosie joined Brooklyn Robins Dry Dock of the National Association Football League (NAFBL). On 19 April 1921, Robins defeated St. Louis Scullin Steel F.C. in the National Challenge Cup. Hosie scored one of the four Robins goals in the 4–2 victory. That summer, several teams from the NAFBL joined with teams from the Southern New England Soccer League to form the American Soccer League (ASL). This move brought the merger Robins Dry Dock and Tebo Yacht Basin F.C., both sponsored by subsidiary companies of Todd Shipyards into a larger Todd Shipyards. Hosie moved from Robins to Todd Shipyards for the inaugural ASL season. By then the American Soccer League had replaced the NAFBL. Hosie did not become a regular until he signed with the Brooklyn Wanderers in 1924. That season, he played in thirty games, but the next season he only appeared in eight.
