= John Marre =

American soccer player, team owner, and executive

John Marre was an early twentieth century U.S. soccer wing forward, team owner and executive who is a member of the National Soccer Hall of Fame.

== Player ==
Marre, a native of St. Louis, Missouri and brother of Harry “Hap” Marre, may have begun playing in the late nineteenth century, but current records are inconclusive. However, he is recorded as having played for both St. Leo's and St. Teresa’s in the St. Louis Soccer League.

== Executive ==
He gained his greatest fame as a team owner and executive. In 1927, he purchased Ratican’s from Harry Ratican and renamed it Tablers, winning three consecutive league titles as both team owner and coach. In 1934, he established the eponymously named team, Marre’s.

He was also a member of the Missouri Soccer Commission and the National Challenge Cup organizing committee.

He was inducted into the National Soccer Hall of Fame in 1953, and the St. Louis Soccer Hall of Fame in 1972.
