= Todd Shipyards (disambiguation) =

Todd Shipyards was an American shipbuilding and ship repair company.

Todd Shipyards may also refer to:

- Todd Shipyards (soccer), an American soccer club based in Brooklyn, New York, US
- Todd Pacific Shipyards, Los Angeles Division, a former shipyard in San Pedro, Los Angeles, California, US
- Todd Pacific Shipyards, Seattle-Tacoma, Washington, US
