= Renzulli =

Renzulli is a surname of Italian origin. Notable people with the surname include:

- Frank Renzulli (born 1959), American film actor, writer and producer
- Joseph Renzulli (born 1936), American educational psychologist
- Peter Renzulli (1895–1980), American soccer goalkeeper
