= Peter Renzulli =

American soccer player (1895–1980)

Pete Renzulli
Personal information
- Full name: Peter Renzulli
- Date of birth: May 6, 1895
- Place of birth: New York, New York, United States
- Date of death: March 14, 1980 (aged 84)
- Place of death: Melville, New York, United States
- Position: Goalkeeper

Senior career*
Years	Team	Apps	(Gls)
–1916	St. George’s		
1916–1918	Manhattan		
1918–1921	Robins Dry Dock		
1921–1922	Todd Shipyard	24	(0)
1922–1923	Paterson F.C.	20	(0)
1924–1927	Indiana Flooring	58	(0)
1927–1930	→ New York Nationals	63	(1)
1930	→ New York Giants	7	(0)
- * Club domestic league appearances and goals

Peter Renzulli (May 6, 1895 – March 14, 1980) was an American soccer goalkeeper. He played in the New York State League, National Association Football League and the American Soccer League, winning three National Challenge Cups. Renzulli was inducted into the National Soccer Hall of Fame in 1951.

== Playing ==
In December 1915, Renzulli played for St. George's of the New York State League. On January 2, 1917, Renzulli played for Manhattan in a game against Brooklyn. The first record of Renzulli playing with Robins Dry Dock in the National Association Football League was a November 1919 game with Federal Shipyard. In 1921, Robins won the National Challenge Cup. In 1921, Robins Dry Dock entered the American Soccer League but under the name Todd Shipyard. Robins Dry Dock was a subsidiary of the Todd Shipyards. Todd Shipyard finished third in the league, but went to the final of the 1922 Challenge Cup, falling to St. Louis Scullin Steel F.C. Todd Shipyard folded at the end of the season and Renzulli moved to Paterson F.C. for the 1922–1923 season. Renzulli went to his third consecutive Challenge Cup, winning his second as Paterson defeated Scullin Steel. Paterson folded at the end of the season and Renzulli was again forced to find a new team. This time, he joined Indiana Flooring, a team he remained with through the rest of his career. In 1927, George Stoneham bought Flooring and renamed the team, the New York Nationals. In 1928, Renzulli won his third Challenge Cup title when the Nationals defeated the Chicago Bricklayers In 1928, the Nationals were short a field player, so Renzulli entered the game as a wing forward, scoring a goal in the 3–1 loss to Philadelphia. In 1930, Stoneham renamed the Nationals the New York Giants. Renzulli played seven games, then retired at the end of the season.

== Honors ==
Renzulli was inducted into the National Soccer Hall of Fame in 1951 and has an annual youth soccer tournament held on Long Island, New York named after him.
