= Babcock & Wilcox (soccer) =

Babcock & Wilcox was a U.S. soccer team which had its origins as the Babcock & Wilcox company team of Bayonne, New Jersey. It spent five seasons in the National Association Football League and finished as runner-up in the 1918 American Cup.

== History ==
They were members of the New Jersey State Amateur Foot Ball League for the 1912-13 season. In 1914, they took part in the National Challenge Cup when Brooklyn Celtic eliminated them 5-0 in the second round. In 1915, Babcock & Wilcox joined the professional National Association Football League. While it regularly went deep in cup competitions, it never finished higher than third in league play. After finishing at the bottom of the standings in the 1918-1919 season, the team withdrew from the NAFBL. After a year out of the league, Babcock & Wilcox returned for the 1920-1921 season. However, the NAFBL folded at the end of the season when several teams joined the newly established American Soccer League. Babcock & Wilcox continued to play in New Jersey leagues until at least 1932 when it won its fifth New Jersey State Cup. In its early years, Andrew Brown, future president of the United States Football Association, worked for the Babcock & Wilcox company, helping to manage the team.

== Year-by-year ==
Year	League	Reg. season	American Cup	National Challenge Cup
1913/14	?	?	?	Third round
1914/15	?	?	Second round	?
1915/16	NAFBL	3rd	Semifinals	Third round
1916/17	NAFBL	3rd	Quarterfinals	First round
1917/18	NAFBL	6th	Final	First round
1918/19	NAFBL	6th	Quarterfinal	First round
1919/20	?	?	?	Third Round
1920/21	NAFBL	6th	Fourth round	First round

== Honors ==
American Cup

- Runner Up (1): 1918

New Jersey State Challenge Cup

- Winner (5): 1916, 1917, 1918, 1919, 1932
