= Harry Ratican =

American soccer player and coach

Personal information
- Full name: Harry Jay Ratican
- Date of birth: January 20, 1894
- Place of birth: St. Louis, Missouri, United States
- Date of death: August 22, 1964 (aged 70)
- Place of death: St. Louis, Missouri, United States
- Position: Forward

Youth career
- St. Louis University

Senior career*
Years	Team	Apps	(Gls)
1914	Teresas	1	(1)
1914–1916	Ben Millers		
1916–1919	Bethlehem Steel		
1920–1921	Robins Dry Dock		
1921	→ Todd Shipyards	7	(2)
1921	Fall River United		
1922	Harrison S.C.	3	(1)
1922	Fall River F.C.	0	(0)
1923	Ben Millers		
1923	New York Giants	1	(0)
1925–1927	Ratican's	?	(10)
1927–1928	→ Tablers	?	(5)

Managerial career
- 1922–1923: West Point
- 1923: Scullin Steel (assistant)
- 1925–1926: St. Louis Pants Store
- Ratican's
- * Club domestic league appearances and goals

Harry Jay Ratican (January 20, 1894 – August 22, 1964) was an American soccer forward, coach and team owner. He began and ended his career in the St. Louis Soccer League with several years in both the National Association Football League and American Soccer League. He is a member of the National Soccer Hall of Fame.

== Soccer career ==
=== Club career ===
Ratican, the younger brother of Peter Ratican, grew up in St. Louis, Missouri, attending the Christian Brothers College High School and St. Louis University. On October 19, 1914, Ratican played his first professional match with the Teresas of the St. Louis Soccer Football League scoring a goal after six minutes of play. The next Sunday, Ratican moved to the Ben Millers (managed by his brother, Pete) of the Federal Park Soccer League, scoring two goals in the match.

In 1916, he left St. Louis to sign with Bethlehem Steel in the National Association Football League (NAFBL). In December, he returned to St. Louis when Bethlehem played two games, one against a St. Louis All Star team, the second against Ratican's old team, Ben Millers. Bethlehem lost 3–1 to the All Star team, with Ratican scoring the lone Bethlehem goal. They then tied Ben Millers 2–2 with Ratican again scoring Bethlehem's first goal of the game. During the 1917–18 season, he and teammate Tommy Fleming led the league in scoring. In April, they both had twenty goals each, but records do not show how many they had at the end of the season. In 1918, Bethlehem won the National Challenge Cup, Ratican scoring in the final, and again in 1919 with Ratican again scoring in the final. However, Ratican was out for much of the 1918–19 season will an unknown illness.

In July, Ratican signed with Robins Dry Dock. However, he still traveled with Bethlehem, serving as team captain, on its tour of Scandinavia that summer. In 1920, the St. Louis Soccer League sent an All Star team on a tour of Scandinavia. Despite playing in the ASL, Ratican was still invited and went on the tour. Ratican won another National Challenge Cup in 1921 with Robins. In 1921, the NAFBL folded when several teams left to form the American Soccer League. Robins Dry Dock merged with Tebo Yacht Basin F.C. to become Todd Shipyards, which was the parent corporation for both Robins Dry Dock and Tebo Yacht Basin. Todd Shipyards lost the 1922 National Challenge Cup to St. Louis Scullin Steel F.C. Ratican did not finish the 1921–22 season with Todd, but moved to Harrison S.C.

Ratican began the 1922–23 season with the Fall River F.C., but a torn ligament in his leg prevented him from playing any games with the team.

Ratican left Fall River in September 1922 to coach the West Point soccer team. He was not released from his playing contract with Fall River until December 1922 at which time he began seeking playing opportunities with other ASL teams. When those did not materialize, he left the northeast on the completion of the collegiate season to return to St. Louis to rejoin Ben Millers, scoring two goals in his debut. He then returned to the ASL later that year to play one game with the New York Giants.

He then gave up playing for several years, except for guest appearances with various St. Louis teams. In 1925, Ratican began playing regularly with his team Ratican's in the SLSL. He remained with Ratican's until it changed sponsorship in 1927. He then continued playing with the renamed team, now known as Tablers for the 1927–28 season. Tablers won the SLSL title that season.

=== Managerial career ===
In September 1922, Ratican was hired by the United States Military Academy at West Point to coach the university's soccer team. Following the completion of the collegiate season, he returned to St. Louis, playing for Ben Millers then serving as an assistant coach with St. Louis Scullin Steel F.C. This pattern continued for several years as Ratican coached West Point and returned to St. Louis during the offseason to play or coach local teams.

In 1924, Ratican formed a team, known appropriately as Ratican's, which he entered in the St. Louis Soccer League. The team performed poorly, finishing fourth out of four teams with a 2-12-4 record. They improved the next season, finishing third with a 4-6-4 record. In 1927, Ratican's again finished last, with a 1-8-3 record. In 1927, Tabler's took over sponsorship of Ratican's team, renaming the squad, Tablers.

Ratican was inducted into the National Soccer Hall of Fame and St. Louis Soccer Hall of Fame in 1950.

== Baseball ==
In addition to soccer, Ratican also played minor league baseball. He spent some time with the Quincy Gems of the Three-I League.
