= Peter Sweeney =

Peter Sweeney may refer to:

- Peter Sweeney (footballer, fl. 1916–1929), early 20th-century Scottish soccer forward
- Peter Barr Sweeny, an American lawyer and politician from New York
- Peter Henry Sweeney, a Scottish football manager, coach and former professional player
