= Peter Sweeney (footballer, fl. 1916–1929) =

Scottish-American soccer player

Personal information
- Place of birth: Scotland
- Position: Forward

Senior career*
Years	Team	Apps	(Gls)
- Beith
1916–1920	Babcock & Wilcox		
1921	Robins Dry Dock		
1921–1922	Todd Shipyard	20	(5)
1922–1923	Paterson	13	(3)
1923–1924	New York Giants	21	(5)
1924–1928	J&P Coats	89	(20)
1928–1929	Jersey City	2	(0)
- * Club domestic league appearances and goals

Peter Sweeney was an early 20th-century Scottish soccer forward who began his professional career in Scotland before playing in the National Association Football League and American Soccer League in the United States.

== Biography ==
Sweeney is reputed to have played with Beith F.C. In October 1916, he was on the roster of Babcock & Wilcox which played in the National Association Football League. Sometime between September 1920 and January 17, 1921, Sweeney transferred to Robins Dry Dock. On April 19, 1921, Sweeney scored Robin's third goal in a 4–2 victory over St. Louis Scullin Steel F.C. in the 1921 National Challenge Cup. That summer, several teams from the NAFBL joined with teams from the Southern New England Soccer League to form the American Soccer League (ASL). This move brought the merger Robins Dry Dock and Tebo Yacht Basin F.C., both sponsored by subsidiary companies of Todd Shipyards into a larger Todd Shipyards team. Sweeney moved to Todd Shipyards for the inaugural ASL season, but the team lasted only one season before folding. Sweeney then transferred to the Paterson for the 1923–1924 season, before moving again, this time to the New York Giants. He remained with the Giants from 1924 until 1928. That year, he moved to the Jersey City team, but played only two games before he left the league.
