= Packard F.C. =

Early 20th century soccer club, sponsored by the auto maker

Packard F.C. of Detroit, Michigan, was an early twentieth century U.S. soccer team sponsored by the Packard automobile corporation. There are only a handful of references to Packards F.C., all associated with the National Challenge Cup. Packard entered each National Challenge Cup, beginning with the first in 1914 through at least the 1920 National Challenge Cup when it lost in the semifinals to Ben Millers.
