= Thomas Murray (soccer) =

Scottish-American soccer player

Tommy Murray
Personal information
- Full name: Thomas E. Murray
- Position: Right half

Senior career*
Years	Team	Apps	(Gls)
1914–1919	Bethlehem Steel F.C.		
1919	Paterson F.C.		
1921–1922	Philadelphia Field Club	22	(3)
1923–1924	Harrison S.C.	0	(0)
1923–1924	Newark Skeeters	23	(1)
1924	Brooklyn Wanderers	7	(0)
1924–1925	Indiana Flooring	14	(2)

International career
1916	United States	2	(0)
- * Club domestic league appearances and goals

Thomas “Tommy” Murray was a Scottish-American football (soccer) right halfback who played the first two U.S. national team games in 1916.

== Professional career ==
Murray played several years for Bethlehem Steel F.C. of the National Association Football League during their years as the dominant U.S. team. He played with the team from at least 1914 to at least 1919. However, in 1918, he spent time in the military when the U.S. entry into World War I. In 1919 he is listed with Paterson F.C. He then moved to Philadelphia Field Club for the 1921-1922 American Soccer League season. In 1923, he is listed as with Harrison S.C., but does not appear to have played a game with them. In 1923, he moved to the Newark Skeeters. In 1924, he began the season with the Brooklyn Wanderers before finishing it with Indiana Flooring. That was his last season in the ASL.

== National team ==
Murray earned two caps with the national team in 1916. In the first official U.S. national team game, the U.S. defeated Sweden on August 20, 1916. On September 3, 1916, Murray and his teammates tied Norway before returning to the U.S.

== Personal ==
In addition to playing for Bethlehem Steel F.C., Murray was also employed as a machinist by the Bethlehem Steel company. He married the former Jessie T. Kerr on July 26, 1917.
