= Philadelphia Merchant Ship =

Philadelphia Merchant Ship F.C. was a short-lived U.S. soccer team of the early twentieth century. It spent two seasons in the National Association Football League and went to the semifinals of the 1919 American Cup.

== History ==
Philadelphia Merchant Ship was the company team for the W. Averell Harriman’s Shipbuilding Company located on the Delaware River near Philadelphia, Pennsylvania. The team exploded onto the national scene in 1918. That year it entered the National Association Football League, finishing tied for second with Paterson F.C., but defeated them in a run off game to take sole possession of second place. That summer, the company entered two teams, Merchant Ship “A” and Merchant Ship “B” in the National Challenge Cup. Both were eliminated in the second round. However, Merchant Ship “A” went to the semifinals of the American Cup before falling to Paterson F.C. and Merchant Ship “B” won the Allied Amateur Cup. The team experienced an immediate drop off in performance the next season, finishing ninth in the NAFBL standings. The team withdrew from the league at the end of the season and disbanded.

== Year-by-year ==
Year	League	Reg. season	American Cup	National Challenge Cup
1918/19	NAFBL	2nd	Semifinal	Second round
1919/20	NAFBL	9th	?	Second round

== Honors ==
League Championship

- Runner Up (1): 1919
