= 1915–16 National Association Foot Ball League season =

National Association Foot Ball League season statistics

National Association Foot Ball League
- Season: 1915–16
- Champion(s): Harrison Alley Boys (1st title)
- Matches: 15

Statistics of National Association Foot Ball League in season 1915–16.

== Season overview ==
The 1915-1916 NAFBL season began the last Sunday of September 1915 and ran through the end of April 1916.

Before the season, Harrison and Bayonne were added. After the season, Harrison withdrew.

== League standings ==
Position	Team	Pts	Pld	W	L	T
1	Harrison Alley Boys	11	8	5	2	1
2	Kearny Scots	9	7	4	2	1
3	Bayonne Babcock & Wilcox	8	5	3	0	2
4	West Hudson A.A.	4	3	1	0	2
5	Brooklyn F.C.	2	3	1	2	0
6	Jersey A.C.	0	4	0	4	0
7	Haledon Thistles	(withdrew during season)				
8	New York Clan MacDonald	(withdrew during season)				
