= Tablers =

Tablers was an American soccer team which spent four seasons in the St. Louis Soccer League, from 1927 to 1931. During that time it won three league titles.

== History ==
In 1927, John Marre purchased Ratican’s, a team which had spent three seasons at the bottom of the league standings, from Harry Ratican, renaming the team Tablers. The change in ownership revitalized the team and Marre coached it to three consecutive league titles. It dropped out of the league after the 1930-1931 season.

== Record ==
Year	Record	League	Open Cup
1927-28	8-3-3	Champion	First Round
1928-29	8-5-4	Champion	Second Round
1929-30	7-4-3	Champion	Quarterfinals
1930-31	7-7-3	2nd	First Round
