= George Lambie =

American soccer referee (1882–1965)

- Born: April 17, 1882; Ardrossan, Scotland, United Kingdom
- Died: November 19, 1965 (aged 83); Winthrop, Massachusetts, United States
- Occupation: Soccer referee

George Lambie (April 17, 1882 – November 19, 1965) was an American soccer referee.

== Biography ==
Lambie was the former dean of American soccer referees. In 1915, the Bethlehem Globe described Lambie as one of the three greatest referees in American soccer. Throughout the 1920s, Lambie officiated many games key to soccer history in the US. He briefly interrupted his soccer career by returned to his native Scotland to fight for the Allies during World War I.

In 1952, he was called "one of US's most famous soccer officials" by the Sarasota Herald tribune while Lambie spent winters residing in Florida to escape the cold of New England. As recently as 2000, Lambie was recognized by The Boston Globe listing his controversial call in the 1927 game pitting the Boston Soccer Club vs. Uruguay as the number 1 moment of the "Best Local Games of the Century".

Lambie came to the United States in 1908 and was naturalized in 1917. He married Bridget (Beat) Rourke on October 30, 1915. They had two children: Margaret in 1921, and Catherine (Kay) in 1924. While Lambie operated his own plumbing and heating business for more than 50 years, he spent much time on the road officiating soccer games. He suffered a stroke in 1952, and moved into the home of his daughter Catherine shortly after. He was also involved in the Order of Scottish Clans. He died in 1965 and is buried in Peabody, Massachusetts.

== Career highlights ==
He officiated the:

- National Cup 1915
- National Challenge Cup 1919
- National Challenge Cup 1926
- Annual Open Cup held by the American Football Association
- American Cup 1916
- American Cup 1918
- American Cup 1920
