= Johnny McGuire =

American soccer player

Jack McGuire
Personal information
- Full name: John McGuire
- Date of birth: March 3, 1893
- Place of birth: Dunblane, Scotland
- Date of death: November 18, 1962 (aged 69)
- Place of death: Brooklyn, New York, United States
- Position: Inside right

Senior career*
Years	Team	Apps	(Gls)
- Dundee
- St Johnstone
1919–1921	Toronto Ulster United		
1921	Robins Dry Dock		
1921–1922	Todd Shipyard	20	(10)
1922–1923	Paterson F.C.	16	(1)
1923–1924	New York Field Club	22	(1)
1924–1925	New Bedford Whalers	37	(6)
1925–1926	Brooklyn Wanderers	13	(2)

International career
1925	United States	1	(0)
- * Club domestic league appearances and goals

Johnny "Jack" McGuire (March 3, 1893 – November 18, 1962) was a soccer player who played as an inside right who played professionally in both Scotland, Canada, and the United States. Born in Scotland, he earned one cap for the United States national team. He is a member of the United States National Soccer Hall of Fame.

== Professional ==
McGuire spent time with Scottish clubs Dundee F.C. and St Johnstone F.C. before moving to Canada in 1919 to play two season with Toronto Ulster United. In 1921, he moved to the U.S. club Robins Dry Dock of the National Association Football League (NAFBL). That year, Robins won the U.S. 1921 National Challenge Cup 4–2 over J&P Coats with McGuire scoring two of Robins four goals. In 1921, the American Soccer League replaced the NAFBL and Robins entered the new league as Todd Shipyards. Robins Dry Dock was part of the larger Todd Shipyard. Todd Shipyards lasted only one season before folding and McGuire moved to Paterson F.C. However, before folding, Todd went to the 1922 National Challenge Cup final where it fell, 3–2 to St. Louis Scullin Steel. McGuire again scored two goals. McGuire once again spent only one year with his new club, Paterson. However, in 1923, he went to his third consecutive Challenge Cup, winning it again this year. McGuire then moved to the New Bedford Whalers for the 1924–1925 season before closing out his career with Brooklyn Wanderers in 1925–1926.

== National team ==
McGuire earned one cap with the U.S. national team in a 6–1 win over Canada on November 8, 1925.

He was inducted into the National Soccer Hall of Fame in 1951.

== See also ==
- List of United States men's international soccer players born outside the United States
