= William Fryer =

English-American soccer player

Tucker Fryer
Personal information
- Date of birth: 22 June 1895
- Place of birth: Burradon, Northumberland, England
- Date of death: 29 August 1960 (aged 65)
- Place of death: Linden, New Jersey, USA
- Position: Half back

Youth career
- Byker West End

Senior career*
Years	Team	Apps	(Gls)
1919–1921	Barnsley	9	(0)
1921	Tebo Yacht Basin		
1921–1922	Todd Shipyards	20	(3)
1922–1923	Paterson	18	(1)
1923–1924	→ New York Giants	15	(2)
1924–1927	Fall River	70	(5)
1927–1929	Brooklyn Wanderers	7	(0)
1930–1931	Newark Americans	17	(0)
- Clan Gordon
- * Club domestic league appearances and goals

William J. Fryer (22 July 1895 – 29 August 1960) was an English-American soccer half back. He is a member of the National Soccer Hall of Fame.

Fryer began his career with Byker West End. In 1919, he signed with Barnsley F.C. and spent two seasons with the club before leaving England for the United States. When he arrived, he signed with Tebo Yacht Basin F.C. of the New York State League. Tebo won both the league and South New York State Cup titles in 1921, but there are no records that show Fryer was with them during that period. In the fall of 1921, Fryer moved to Todd Shipyards of the newly established American Soccer League. In 1922, Fryer and this teammates lost the final of the National Challenge Cup to St. Louis Scullin Steel F.C. Todd Shipyards left the league at the end of the season, and Fryer moved to Paterson Fryer and Paterson went to the 1923 National Challenge Cup final, defeating Scullin Steel for the title. In 1923, Paterson was sold to new ownership which moved the team to New York, renaming it the New York Giants. Fryer began the 1923–1924 season, but was traded to the Fall River for the record fee of $1,500. He remained in Fall River until 1927 when he moved to the Brooklyn Wanderers. During his time in Fall River, Fryer won three league titles. In 1930, he moved to the Newark Americans. He finished his career with the semi-professional Clan Gordon of an unknown league.

Fryer was inducted into the National Soccer Hall of Fame in 1951.
