= James Ford (soccer) =

American soccer player

Jimmy Ford
Personal information
- Full name: James Ford
- Date of birth: 1889
- Place of birth: Kearney, New Jersey, United States
- Date of death: Unknown
- Position: Outside right

Senior career*
Years	Team	Apps	(Gls)
1914–1915	Brooklyn Field Club		
1915–1916	Bethlehem Steel		
1915–1916	Jersey City		
1916	→ New York Clan MacDonald (loan)		
1916–1917	Kearny Ryerson		
1917	Kearny Scots		
1919	Bethlehem Steel		
1920–1921	Erie A.A.		
1922–1923	Harrison S.C.	24	(6)
1923–1924	New York Giants	4	(0)
1924–1925	Newark Skeeters	22	(5)

International career
1916	United States	1	(0)
- * Club domestic league appearances and goals

James "Jimmy" or "Bow" Ford was an American soccer outside right who earned one cap with the U.S. national team in 1916. He played professionally in the National Association Football League and the American Soccer League, scoring goals in the first two National Challenge Cup Finals.

== Professional career ==
The son of English immigrants, Ford was born in 1889 in Kearney, New Jersey. In 1913, Ford, along with his brother John, turned professional with the Brooklyn Field Club of the National Association Football League. In 1914, Brooklyn won the 1914 National Challenge Cup with Ford scoring the winning goal in the 87th minute. Later in 1914, Ford signed with Bethlehem Steel On May 3, 1915, Ford scored in his second consecutive Challenge Cup final, as Bethlehem defeated Brooklyn Celtic. However, he soon after moved to Jersey City in the New Jersey National League. In the spring of 1916, he went on loan to New York Clan MacDonald. In 1916, he was with Kearny Ryerson, also known as Kearny A.C., when he was called up for the first official U.S. national team games. That fall, he signed with the Kearny Scots and played with the team until inducted into the army when the United States entered World War I. After serving with the 29th Division in France. In 1919, he joined Bethlehem for a tour of Scandinavia. In 1920, he joined Erie A.A. of the NAFBL. In 1921, Erie joined the newly established American Soccer League and changed its name to Harrison S.C. In 1923, he moved to the New York Giants, then to the Newark Skeeters in 1924. He retired in 1925.

== National team ==
Ford earned his one cap with the national team in its first official game, a 3–2 victory over Sweden on August 20, 1916.
