= Rochester City Moose A.F.C. =

American soccer club

Rochester City Moose
- Full name: Rochester City Moose Association Football Club
- Nicknames: Moose, Rochester City
- Founded: 1910 (as Sons of St. George), 1911 (as Rochester City), 1919 (as Rochester City Moose)
- Dissolved: 1932
- League: Rochester and District League
Home colors

The Rochester City Moose A.F.C. were an American soccer club based out of Rochester, New York. The club participated in the 1919–20 National Challenge Cup, now the Lamar Hunt U.S. Open Cup and won the Rochester & District Soccer League that same season.

== History ==
The club was founded in 1910 as the Sons of St. George and played one season in the Rochester and District League under this name. In 1911 they changed their name to Rochester City. For the 1919 season they affiliated with the Moose club and changed their name to the Rochester City Moose.

== Honors ==
- Rochester & District League
  - Winners 1919–20 1
