= Hap Marre =

American soccer player

Harry "Hap" Marre was an early twentieth-century American soccer inside left who spent his entire professional career in the St. Louis Soccer League.

Marre, a native of St. Louis, Missouri and brother of National Soccer Hall of Fame member John Marre, gained his greatest fame as a member of Ben Millers. Most details regarding his career are obscure, but he is listed on the Ben Miller roster as early as 1916. In 1917, he was the captain of Ben Millers. In 1918, he joined the United States Navy during World War I, playing for the Navy's soccer team. After the war, he returned to Ben Millers going to the 1920 National Challenge Cup final with them. In that game, he scored a goal in the Ben Millers’ 2–1 victory over Fore River.

Marre was inducted into the St. Louis Soccer Hall of Fame in 1973.
