= James Rhody =

American soccer player (1896–1944)

Jimmy Rhody
Personal information
- Full name: James Rhody
- Date of birth: July 17, 1896
- Place of birth: Paterson, New Jersey, United States
- Date of death: 1944 (aged 47–48)
- Place of death: Kearny, New Jersey, United States
- Position: Forward

Senior career*
| Years | Team | Apps | (Gls) |
| 1922–1923 | Harrison S.C. | 18 | (3) |

International career
| 1924 | United States | 1 | (0) |
- * Club domestic league appearances and goals

James "Jimmy" Rhody (July 17, 1896 – 1944) was an American soccer player who earned one cap with the U.S. national team on June 16, 1924, scoring the sole U.S. goal in a 3–1 loss to Irish Free State in Dublin. He was also part of the U.S. team for the 1924 Summer Olympics, but he did not play in any matches.

He was born in Paterson, New Jersey. He played one season, 1922 to 1923, for Harrison S.C. of the American Soccer League.
