= 1916–17 American Cup =

Soccer tournament

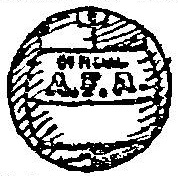

Tournament details
- Country: United States
- Dates: October 1916 – May 1917
- Teams: 33

Final positions
- Champions: Bethlehem (3rd title)
- Runners-up: West Hudson

The 1917 American Cup was the annual challenge cup held by the American Football Association. At the A.F.A.'s annual meeting on June 24 at the Continental Hotel in Newark, NJ the delegates elected were president Duncan Carswell of Orange, vice–president Donald McMillan of East Newark, treasurer Harry Craig of Paterson, recording secretary Robert M. Marshall of Arlington, and corresponding secretary Andrew H. Beveridge of Arlington. Thirty-three teams entered the competition however none of the major Massachusetts teams entered. A new rule that season made by the Southern New England FA forbade their clubs from entering more than one tournament other than the State Cup. This being the case most of the teams opted for the National Cup instead. Bethlehem Steel brought home the trophy for the third time with a convincing 7-0 final win against the West Hudsons.

== Preliminary round ==
The draw for the preliminary and first rounds was held October 1, 1916 at the Continental Hotel in Newark, NJ. The Preliminary round featured one game between Putnam of Philadelphia and Victor Talking Machine Company of Camden.

Pennsylvania District

October 14, 1916

Putnam	7–0	Victor
Ihrig (3); T. Walsh; Hemingway; Brown; Brooks (pk)

Philadelphia, PA
Referee: James Walder

== First round ==
The first round games were scheduled to be completed by October 28. Brooklyn disbanded and were replaced with Continental. The Pan–Americans and Rovers of Fall River entered the tournament and were drawn together however no match was played per the SNEFA ruling this season. They were replaced with the Chicopee Rovers and Bridgeport Rangers. Scottish American advanced when Yonkers disbanded. Ford and Dublin won their first round engagements however both teams were disqualified due to fielding ineligible players allowing Continental and Clan MacDonald to advance.

New England District

October 28, 1916

Pan–American	–	Fall River Rovers

Fall River, MA
November 5, 1916

Bridgeport City	5–1	General Electric (MA)
Hunziker (3); Satterwaite; Taylor		Kane

Meadows, Bridgeport, CT
Referee: G. Denholme (Ansonia)
November 11, 1916

Chicopee Rovers	2–2	Bridgeport Rangers
20' Logan (pk); 30' Hardiman		15' Stanley; 1H' Stanley

Berkshire St. grounds, Holyoke
Referee: Bob Young

replay

November 30, 1916

Bridgeport Rangers	0–2	Chicopee Rovers
		75' Logan; 80' Daly

Meadows, Bridgeport, CT
Referee: Joe Booth

NY/NJ District

October 15, 1916

Alley Boys	3–1	Splitdorf
15' Cunningham; 63' Arberthnot; 66' Cunningham		62' Charlie Fisher

Clark's Field, East Newark
Referee: Andrew Lawrie
October 28, 1916

General Electric (NY)	4–1	Bunker Hill
Harry Tolson (2); Good; Yuille		Vail

Schenectady, NY
Referee: Pinkerton
October 29, 1916

Scottish American	w/o	Yonkers

October 29, 1916

IRT Strollers	0–0	Brooklyn Celtic

Lenox Oval, Manhattan
Referee: Cunningham
October 29, 1916

Jersey A.C.	3–1	Ironside
Willie Kaelsch; 35' Jack Neilson; Willie Kaelsch		Crompton

Washburn Oval, Jersey City
October 29, 1916

Babcock & Wilcox	4–1	Greenpoint
15' Vander Wolf; 30' Sweeney; 50' Sweeney; 70' Vander Wolf		20' Moran

Bayonne, NJ
Referee: Andrew Lawrie (Newark)
October 29, 1916

Ford	2–1	Continental
50' Pettigrew; 55' Sherlock		65' Brett

Clark's Field, East Newark
Referee: Frank Smith
October 29, 1916

New York FC	1–0	Clan MacDuff
55' Puxty

Harlem Oval, NY
Referee: A. Burnside
November 5, 1916

Dublin	1–1	Clan MacDonald
Neil		Mitchell (pk)

Olympic Park, Paterson, NJ
November 7, 1916

West Hudson	8–1	Greenville
48' Wuest; Brierley; Allen; Wuest; Brierley; Brown; Allen; Allen		Bishoff

Clark's Athletic Field, East Newark
Referee: Michael King
November 12, 1916

Bay Ridge	2–1	Irish American
Porter; Hough		Dorkin

Hawthorne Field, Brooklyn
Referee: A. Burnside

replays

November 5, 1916

Brooklyn Celtic	3–2	IRT Strollers

Washburn Park, Jersey City
December 3, 1916

Clan MacDonald	0–1	Dublin
		1' Boardman

Hawthorne Field, Brooklyn
Attendance: 1000
Referee: Charlie Ward (Passaic)

Pennsylvania District

October 28, 1916

Feltonville	2–3	Falls CFC
2' Demko; 1H' Foster (pk)		17' H. Beech; 67' Smart; 77' H. Derbyshire

Potter Field, Philadelphia
October 28, 1916

Henry Disston	8–0	Hibernian
Coursey (2); McEwen (2); Barrett (2); Dutcher; Rogers

Tacony Ball Park
Referee: George Allen
October 28, 1916

Bethlehem Steel	6–1	Putnam
1H' Fleming (pk); 1H' Butler; 2H' Fleming (2); 2H' Butler; Fletcher		3' Gheeig

New Athletic Field, Bethlehem, PA
Referee: J.H. Carpenter

== Second round ==
The draw for the second round was held November 11, 1916 at the Continental hotel in Newark, NJ. Matches were due to be played on or before November 30. The Chicopee Rovers were under suspension allowing Clan MacDonald to advance.

November 26, 1916

New York FC	3–1	Bridgeport City
10' Cooper; 1H' Hayes; 55' Carver		1H' Hunziker

Harlem Oval
Attendance: 2000
Referee: Alexander Burnside
November 26, 1916

West Hudson	1–0	Bay Ridge
25' Dave Brown (pk)

Clark's Field, East Newark
Attendance: 2000
Referee: Andrew Laurie (Newark)
November 30, 1916

Clan MacDonald	w/o	Chicopee Rovers

November 30, 1916

Alley Boys	2–2	Jersey A.C.
10' Bannon; 51' O'Donnell		50' Hogan; 80' Jim Ingram

Clark's Field, East Newark
Referee: Mike King
December 3, 1916

Brooklyn Celtic	6–0	Falls CFC
Parker (2); Ellis (2); Stark (2)

Harlem Oval, NY
Referee: C. Creighton
December 3, 1916

Continental	2–1	General Electric (NY)
Zehnbauer; Clow		Carstairs

Lenox Oval
December 9, 1916

Bethlehem Steel	2–0	Henry Disston
Neil Clarke; Pepper

New Athletic Field, Bethlehem, PA
Referee: Andrew Laurie (Newark)
December 10, 1916

Scottish American	1–2	Babcock & Wilcox
2H' Walsh		15' Dave Muir; 1H' Dave Muir

Clark's Field, East Newark
Attendance: 2000
Referee: Andrew Lawrie (Newark)

replay

December 10, 1916

Jersey A.C.	2–1	Alley Boys
James Ford; 89' Hogan		O'Donnell

Washburn Park, Jersey City
Referee: Michael King

== Third round ==
The draw for the third round was held December 16, 1916 at the Continental hotel in Newark, NJ. Games were to be played by January 28.

January 14, 1917

Jersey A.C.	0–9	Brooklyn Celtic
		O'Halloran (5); McGreevey (2); McKenna; Parker

Washburn Park, Jersey City
Referee: A. Laurie
January 21, 1917

Clan MacDonald	4–1	Continental
25', 60', 65' Finn; 85' Craig		35' Brett

Lenox Oval, Manhattan
Attendance: 3000
Referee: A. Burnside
January 28, 1917

New York FC	1–2	Bethlehem Steel
1H' Hayes		65' Chadwick; 80' McKelvey

Harlem Oval, NY
Attendance: 5000
Referee: T. Cunningham
April 1, 1917

Babcock & Wilcox	1–1	West Hudson
83' Dave Muir		52' Davie Brown

B&W grounds, Bayonne
Attendance: 600
Referee: John Nesbitt (Staten Island)

replay

April 8, 1917

West Hudson	4–0	Babcock & Wilcox
13', 2H' Dave Brown; Wuest; Del Brierley

Clark's Field, East Newark
Attendance: 1000
Referee: Charlie Creighton (New York)

== Semifinals ==
March 11, 1917

Clan MacDonald	0–5	Bethlehem Steel
Sarson (og)		17' Harry McKelvey; 55' Fleming; 75' Forrest; Harry McKelvey

Clark's Field, East Newark
Referee: Andrew Lawrie (Newark)
April 22, 1917

West Hudson	1–0	Brooklyn Celtic
83' Dave Brown

Clark's Field, East Newark
Attendance: 1600
Referee: James Walders (Philadelphia)

== Final ==
The American Cup final took place in Wiedenmayer's Park in Newark, NJ. The West Hudsons, fifth in the National Association Football League, had been the champions of the American Cup on three previous occasions. Bethlehem Steel came into the final having played 36 games winning 32 with two ties and a two losses. They had scored 135 goals with 25 against. Both teams had met in February in the third round of the National Challenge Cup with Bethlehem advancing. On May 5 the 'Steelmen' finished runner–up in the National Challenge Cup to Fall River.

May 13, 1917

West Hudson A.A.	0–7	Bethlehem Steel
		17' George McKelvey; 19' Jimmy Easton; Fred Pepper; Fred Pepper(McKelvey); Jimmy Easton(Fleming); Paddy Butler; 80' Tommy Fleming

Wiedenmayer's Park; Newark, New Jersey
Attendance: 3500
Referee: Charles E. Creighton

== See also ==
- 1917 National Challenge Cup
- 1916–17 National Association Foot Ball League season
- 1916–17 Southern New England Soccer League season
