= 1919–20 National Association Foot Ball League season =

National Association Foot Ball League
- Season: 1919–20
- Champion(s): Bethlehem Steel (2nd title)
- Matches: 70

Statistics of National Association Football League in season 1919–20.

Before the season, Brooklyn Morse dry dock, Kearny Erie, Kearny Federal Ship, Philadelphia Disston, and New york IRT were added. New York IRT withdrew early in the season. After the season, Brooklyn Morse Dry Dock, and Philadelphia Merchant Ship withdrew.

== League standings ==
Position	Team	Pts	Pld	W	L	T	GF	GA
1	Bethlehem Steel	25	15	12	1	2	34	9
2	Erie A.A.	24	16	11	2	3	37	21
3	Brooklyn Robins Dry Dock	22	14	10	2	2	33	22
4	Paterson F.C.	15	15	7	1	7	23	29
5	New York F.C.	12	14	4	4	6	17	24
6	Brooklyn Morse Dry Dock	11	14	4	3	7	22	20
7	Philadelphia Disston	6	12	2	2	8	16	19
8	Kearny Federal Ship	6	11	2	2	7	19	28
9	Philadelphia Merchant Ship	3	13	0	3	10	7	36
10	New York IRT	0	5	0	5	0		
