= 1920–21 National Association Foot Ball League season =

National Association Foot Ball League
- Season: 1920–21
- Champion(s): Bethlehem Steel (3rd title)
- Matches: 70

Statistics of National Association Foot Ball League in season 1920-21.

Before the season, Bayonne rejoined the league. Paterson F.C. withdrew early in the season and was replaced by Bunker Hill F.C.

The league folded at the end of the season, but the next season, the ASL I started off and led US Soccer to new heights.

== League standings ==
| Position | Team | Pts | Pld | W | L | T | GF | GA |
|---|---|---|---|---|---|---|---|---|
| 1 | Bethlehem Steel | 23 | 12 | 11 | 0 | 1 | | |
| 2 | New York F.C. | 17 | 11 | 8 | 2 | 1 | | |
| 3 | Brooklyn Robins Dry Dock | 12 | 12 | 5 | 5 | 2 | | |
| 4 | Kearny Federal Ship | 9 | 10 | 3 | 4 | 3 | | |
| 5 | Kearny Erie A.A. | 8 | 9 | 3 | 4 | 2 | | |
| 6 | Bayonne Babcock & Wilcox | 5 | 12 | 2 | 9 | 1 | | |
| 7 | Philadelphia Disston | 4 | 9 | 1 | 6 | 2 | | |
| 8 | Bunker Hill F.C. | 0 | 3 | 0 | 3 | 0 | | |
