= Davey Brown =

American soccer player

Personal information
- Full name: David Edward Brown
- Date of birth: November 18, 1898
- Place of birth: East Newark, New Jersey, United States
- Date of death: September 17, 1970 (aged 71)
- Place of death: Kearny, New Jersey, United States
- Height: 5 ft 3 in (1.60 m)
- Position: Forward

Senior career*
Years	Team	Apps	(Gls)
1915–1916	Ford		
1916–1918	West Hudson A.A.	?	(?)
1918–1920	Paterson F.C.	?	(?)
1920–1921	Erie A.A.	?	(?)
1921–1923	→ Harrison S.C.	36	(16)
1923–1924	Newark Skeeters	12	(5)
1924–1930	New York Giants	213	(165)
1928	Brooklyn Wanderers (guest)	3	(0)
1931	New York Giants	30	(18)
1932–1935	Brooklyn F.C./Brooklyn Celtic		

International career^{‡}
1925–1926	United States	3	(4)
- * Club domestic league appearances and goals as of May 31, 2006 ‡ National team caps and goals as of June 22, 2006

David "Davey" Brown (November 18, 1898 – September 17, 1970) was an American soccer forward. He spent most of his career playing for teams in New Jersey and New York, gaining his greatest fame with the New York Giants. He is a member of the National Soccer Hall of Fame.

== Professional career ==
Brown began his professional career with Ford before moving to West Hudson A.A. for the 1917–1918 National Association Foot Ball League (NAFBL) season. When West Hudson withdrew from the NAFBL at the end of the season, Brown moved to Paterson F.C. where he spent the next two seasons. At the end of the 1919–1920 season, Paterson withdrew from the league despite finishing in the top half of the standings each season. Brown then moved to Erie A.A. for the 1920–1921 NAFBL season. At the end of that season, Erie A.A. switched to the newly established American Soccer League (ASL) and changed its name to Harrison Soccer Club (S.C.). In various publications the team was also known as Harrison S.C. and Harrison Field Club (F.C.). Regardless of the name, Brown remained with this team through the end of the 1922–1923 season. He then spent a single season with the Newark Skeeters in the Skeeters’ first season in the ASL.

In 1924, Brown moved to the New York Giants where he gained his greatest fame three years later. In the 1926–1927 season, he scored fifty-two goals in thirty-eight games, one of the most productive seasons by any player in an American outdoor league. However, that season was an anomaly. While Brown was a consistent goal scorer, he more typically would score between eleven and twenty-eight goals a season.

With the onset of the Soccer War in 1928, Brown's career becomes erratic. When the Giants were suspended by the ASL, Brown moved to the Brooklyn Wanderers for three games. However, he then rejoined the Giants, when they began playing in the newly established Eastern Professional Soccer League. In 1930, the Giants rejoined the ASL, but under new ownership and a new name, the New York Soccer Club. New York SC folded at the end of the 1930 fall season and Brown moved to the second New York Giants. When the New York Giants had become the New York Soccer Club, Charles Stoneman, owner of both the ASL New York Nationals and the American baseball team New York Giants decided to rename his Nationals club the Giants. By that time the Great Depression and the Soccer Wars had begun to decimate the American Soccer League. Brown played out the 1931 season with the Giants but moved to the Brooklyn F.C. in 1932. The ASL collapsed in 1933 to be replaced by the second, and unrelated, American Soccer League. Brooklyn SC joined the second ASL but failed twelve games into the season. Brooklyn Celtic then joined the league, absorbing most of Brooklyn F.C.'s players as well as the team's record. Brown remained with Celtic until his retirement in 1935.

In addition to his regular teams, Brown served as a guest player twice, in 1919 and in 1920. In 1919, Bethlehem Steel signed Brown as a guest player during the team's Scandinavian tour. Bethlehem went 7-2-5 during that tour. Then St. Louis took Brown along for their 1920 European tour. St. Louis went 6–2–6.

== National team ==
Brown earned three caps with the U.S. national team in 1925 and 1926. All three games came against Canada. In those three games, Canada won the first game, by a 1–0 score. The U.S. won the next two games, each with a 6–1 score. Brown got two goals in both wins. He was later injured which prevented him from participating in the 1930 FIFA World Cup, at which the U.S. placed third.

In 1951, Brown was inducted into the National Soccer Hall of Fame.
