= 1921–22 American Cup =

Soccer tournament

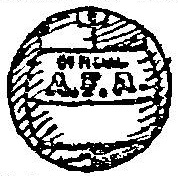

Tournament details
- Country: United States
- Teams: 0
- Defending champions: Robins Dry Dock

Tournament statistics
- Games played: 0

The 1921–22 American Cup tournament was not held. In accordance with new rules passed by the USFA, the American Football Association did not conduct a tournament for the 1921–22 season. The hiatus was brief, though, with the tournament resuming the following season.

== History ==
On previous occasions, the tournament was either diminished or not held. In the period from 1899 to 1905, the tournament was not held because the AFA had disbanded, for mostly economic reasons. In 1906 the opportunity for re-establishment arose and the tournament resumed.

The tournament was next affected in the 1916–17 season, by rules adopted in the Southern New England FA. With Massachusetts teams forced to choose just one out-of-state tournament, some chose the National Challenge Cup. The 1917 edition went on as planned, but the AFA suffered a financial loss from the withdrawals of the Massachusetts squads.

== Ruling ==
The situation this season was far more serious. The USFA established a new rule that allowed only for State Cup competitions in addition to the National Cup. Competitions like the Peel Cup and the American Cup accepted out of state entries. With the AFA operating out of New Jersey, the new ruling would not allow for the other major districts that regularly took part in the American Cup (New England, New York, and Eastern Pennsylvania) to compete, leaving only New Jersey participating. Thus, with an insufficient number of entries to conduct a viable tournament, the AFA was forced to abandon the 1922 edition. Other factors included fixture congestion with the inaugural season of the American Soccer League. The ASL opened with eight teams and had intended for 28 game schedule. A number of the frequent contenders for the American Cup took part in the first ASL season. Consequently, there were those opposed to this action by the U.S. Federation. The ruling itself had initially only passed by one vote. It had been noted that it was a detrimental move to the growth of the game and that American Cup games had been more lucrative than the National Cup games and the American League games. Eventually the American Cup was allowed to resume operations after the USFA meeting in May 1922. The American Cup could be played provided the respective state associations granted permission to their registered teams to participate.

== Holders ==
The Robins Dry Dock squad of Brooklyn had won the two previous editions of the tournament, the second of which was paired with a National Challenge Cup win to complete 'the double'. Robins had merged with the Tebo Yacht Basin team to become the Todd Shipyards, which finished runner-up in the 1922 National Cup, giving credibility to a potential repeat as American Cup champions had they been able to defend their title. Many of the Todds players made their way to Paterson F.C. for the 1922/23 season, strengthening them sufficiently to win the National Cup; however, they fell shy of the American Cup, losing out in the semifinals.

== New Jersey State Cup ==
Aside from the National Challenge Cup the next highest level of tournament competition for New Jersey teams was the State Cup. The professional ASL team from Harrison benefited from not having any of their counterparts hailing from New Jersey as they easily won the State Championship. Harrison was only able to defeat the American Cup holders one time in five attempts, one being an elimination from the Eastern Semifinal of the NCC. Meanwhile, other regular AFA competitors featured in their respective state competitions.

Third round
March 19 - Harrison Field
Harrison S.C.	6
Entre Nous	1
Royal Oak	1
Trenton F.C.	0
March 19 - Palisades Park
Palisades Park	3
Standard Bleachery	0
March 19 - Montgomery Oval
Hudson FC	2
Paterson Thistle	1
March 19 - Harrison Field
Newark Antlers	3
Babcock & Wilcox	1
March 19 - Clark's Field
National F.C.	2
Kearny	1
Carlton Hill	4
Delawana	2
Totowa Rovers	1
Cedar Cliff	0

Quarter-finals
April 2 - Harrison Field
Harrison	7
Royal Oak	1
Palisades Park	2
Hudson	4
April 2 - Harrison Field
Antler	4
National F.C.	0
Carlton Hill	1
Totowa Rovers	2

Semi-finals
May 7 - Paterson
Harrison	7
Hudson	1
April 30 - Totowa
Antler	2
Totowa Rovers	1

Final
May 14 - Olympic Park
Harrison	2
Antler	0

=== New York State Challenge Cup ===
Quarter-finals
March 12 – New York Oval
New York	4
Bay Ridge	1
April 3 – New York Oval
Catholic Club	0
Centro Hispano	1
March 12 – Todd Field
Todd Shipyards	5
Greenpoint	2
March 19 – Ridgewood Grounds
Brooklyn	4
Steinway A	1

Semi-finals
April 9 – New York Oval
New York	5
Centro Hispano	3
April 9 – Todd Field
Todd Shipyards	2
Brooklyn	0

Final
April 30 – New York Oval
New York	3
Todd Shipyards	0

=== Massachusetts State Cup ===
Quarter-finals
December 10 – Whitinsville
Whitins Machine Works	2
Farr Alpaca	4
December 3 – Charlestown
Charlestown	1
Lynn Thistles	2
December 10 – Lynn
Gray & Davis	0
Abbot Worsted	2
December 24 – Andover
Smith & Dove	1
Fore River	3

Semi-finals
April 8 – Holyoke
Farr Alpaca	5
Lynn Thistle	0
April 8 – Lawrence
Abbot Worsted	3
Fore River	1

Final
Apr 29/May 6 – Quincy
Farr Alpaca	1–3
Abbot Worsted	1–2

=== Connecticut State Cup ===
Quarter-finals
November 20 – Stamford
Danersk Athletics	5
Hartford	2
November 20 – South Manchester
Manchester	5
Ansonia	2
Bridgeport City
bye
New Haven
bye

Semi-finals
December 4 – Bridgeport
Danersk Athletics	2
Manchester	0
December 18 – Bridgeport
Bridgeport City	0
New Haven	4

Final
March 19 – Bridgeport
Danersk Athletics	2
New Haven	1

=== Peel Challenge Cup ===
Quarter-finals
April 9 – Chicago
Thistles	2
Swedish	0
April 9 – Gary
Gary	2
Olympia	4
April 9 – Chicago
Pullman	2
Canadian Club	1
April 9 – Chicago
Rangers	7
Norwegian	0

Semi-finals
May 7 – Chicago
Thistles	1
Olympia	2
May 7/14 – Chicago
Pullman	0–2
Rangers	0–1

Final
Jun 4/11 – Chicago
Olympia	2–3
Pullman	2–2

== See also ==
- 1921–22 National Challenge Cup
- 1921–22 American Soccer League
