= James Green (footballer) =

English footballer

Personal information
- Full name: James Green
- Date of birth: 4 July 1879
- Place of birth: Whittle-le-Woods, England
- Date of death: 1949 (aged 76–77)
- Position: Winger

Senior career*
Years	Team	Apps	(Gls)
1898–1900	Preston North End	6	(0)
1900	Chorley		
Total		6	(0)
- * Club domestic league appearances and goals

James Green (4 July 1879 – 1949) was an English footballer who played in the Football League for Preston North End.
