= Ratican's =

Ratican’s was a U.S. soccer team established by Harry Ratican in 1924 in St. Louis, Missouri. It spent three seasons in the St. Louis Soccer League before becoming Tablers in 1927.

== History ==
In 1924, Harry Ratican, U.S. soccer player and coach, entered an eponymously named team into the St. Louis Soccer League. Ratican had previously experienced considerable success during his Hall of Fame playing career and as a collegiate coach. However, he was unable to translate that into success as a professional team owner. Even taking the field with Ratican’s in the 1925–1926 and 1926–1927 seasons failed to help as the team finished at the bottom of the league each of its three seasons. In 1927, the team changed sponsorship and was renamed Tablers.

== Record ==
| Year | Record | League | Open Cup |
|---|---|---|---|
| 1924–25 | 2–12–4 | 4th | |
| 1925–26 | 4–6–4 | 3rd | 2nd Round |
| 1926–27 | 1–8–3 | 4th | 1st Round |
