= Palmer Park (Chicago) =

Coordinates: 41.6910°N 87.6158°W

- U.S. National Register of Historic Places
- U.S. Historic district
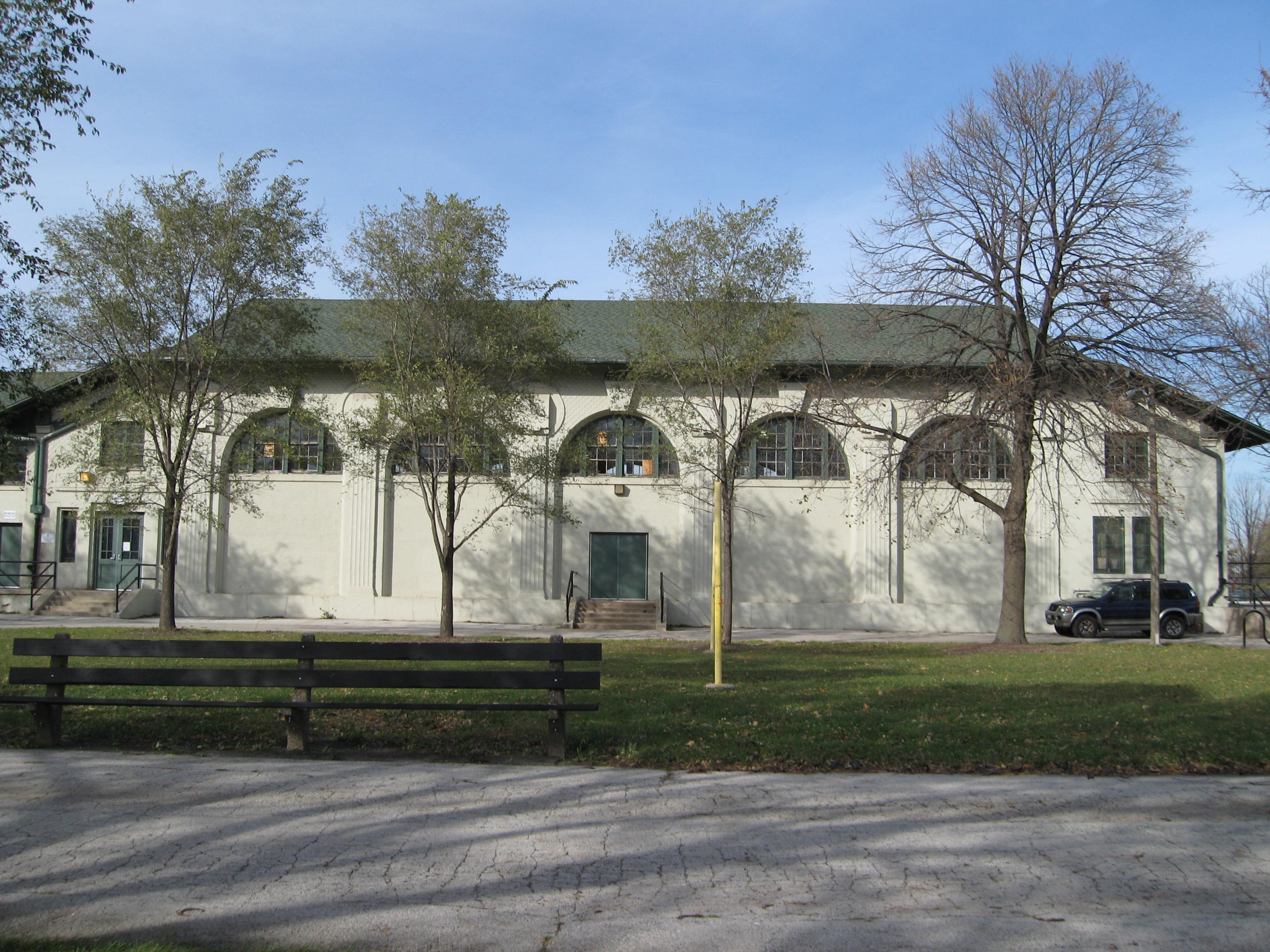

- Location within Chicago metropolitan area Location within Illinois Location within the United States
- Location: 201 E. 111th St., Chicago, Illinois 60628
- Area: 40.5 acres (16.4 ha)
- Architect: D.H Burnham and Co.; Olmstead Bros
- Architectural style: Beaux-Arts
- MPS: Chicago Park District MPS
- NRHP reference No.: 07000855
- Added to NRHP: August 30, 2007

Palmer Park is an urban park at 201 E. 111th Street on the far South Side of Chicago, Illinois, USA.

== History ==
Palmer Park was created in 1904 by the South Park Commission. Under the guidance of superintendent J. Frank Foster, the commission opened ten new neighborhood parks, including Palmer Park, in an effort to create breathing space and recreational areas in the city's crowded tenement districts. These parks were built by Olmsted Brothers landscape architects and D.H. Burnham and Co. architects. The park is named for Potter Palmer, a successful businessman and real estate investor concerned with the development of Chicago. Palmer was responsible for reclaiming the acres of swampland north of the city's business district, which were developed into the Lake Shore Drive area. He built the original baseball field for the Cubs' predecessor, the Chicago White Stockings, and built the Palmer House Hotel.

In 1934, the city's 22 independent park commissions were consolidated into a new unified system, and Palmer Park became park of the Chicago Park District. Park district art director James McBurney painted three murals for Palmer Park as a Works Progress Administration project with money from the federal government. The three are: "Native Americans," "Explorers," and "Dutch settlers." Other noteworthy McBurney murals are found at the Wentworth School, Tilden High School, and Woodlawn National Bank.

== Facilities ==
The park, located just south of Gwendolyn Brooks College Preparatory Academy is open daily from dawn to dusk, with free admission. Facilities at the park include baseball fields, an indoor gym, meeting rooms, an outdoor swimming pool, and tennis courts.
