= John Hemingsley =

American soccer player

Rabbit Hemingsley
Personal information
- Full name: John J. Hemingsley
- Place of birth: Newark, New Jersey, United States
- Position: Center forward

Senior career*
Years	Team	Apps	(Gls)
1914–1916	Kearny Scots		
1916–1917	New York F.C.		
1917–1918	West Hudson A.A.		
1918–1919	Philadelphia Merchant Ship		
1919–1920	Paterson F.C.		
1920–1921	Erie A.A.		
1921–1922	→ Harrison S.C.	22	(16)
1922–1923	Paterson F.C.	10	(3)
1923–1924	Newark Skeeters	16	(3)
1924	J&P Coats	3	(1)
1924–1926	Newark Skeeters	32	(12)

International career
1916	United States	2	(0)
- * Club domestic league appearances and goals

John J. "Rabbit" Hemingsley (also spelled Heminsley) was a U.S. soccer center forward who played the first two U.S. national team games in 1916. He spent seven seasons in the National Association Football League and five in the American Soccer League.

== Professional career ==
Hemingsley was a resident of Kearny, New Jersey. fIn 1914, Hemingsley began his professional career with the Kearny Scots of the National Association Football League. Kearny won the 1915 American Cup. He then played with New York F.C. for the 1916–1917 season and the 1917–1918 season with West Hudson A.A. He played the 1918–1919 season with Philadelphia Merchant Ship. In 1919, he traveled with Bethlehem Steel F.C. on the team's tour of Scandinavia. Hemingsley is listed with Paterson F.C. in July 1920. He then played at least the 1920–1921 season with Erie A.A. When the NAFBL folded in 1921, Erie moved to the first American Soccer League where it played under the name, Harrison S.C. In 1923, he moved to Paterson F.C., but after ten games, was transferred to the Newark Skeeters for the end of the season. In 1924, he began the season with J&P Coats, but after only three games, returned to the Skeeters where he remained through the end of the 1925–1926 season.

== National team ==
Hemingsley earned two caps with the national team in 1916. In the first official U.S. national team game, the U.S. defeated Sweden on August 20, 1916. On September 3, 1916, Hemingsley and his teammates tied Norway before returning to the U.S.
