= 1919–20 National Challenge Cup =

American soccer tournament season

- Dewar Challenge Cup

Tournament details
- Country: United States
- Dates: December 24, 1919 – May 9, 1920

Final positions
- Champions: Ben Millers (1st title)
- Runners-up: Fore River
- Semifinalists: Robins Dry Dock; Packard F.C.

The 1919–20 National Challenge Cup was the annual open cup held by the United States Football Association now known as the Lamar Hunt U.S. Open Cup. This edition featured 99 teams in two divisions. The western division had 41 teams in six districts while the eastern division had 58 teams also divided into six districts. The draw for the first round took place on October 13, 1919, in New York.

== Bracket ==
Home teams listed on top of bracket

Third round Dec 24–Jan 8
IL	Bricklayers and Masons F.C.	w/o
IL	Lincoln Park F.C.
IL	Palmer Park	1
IL	Olympia F.C.	3
MO	Ben Millers	2
MO	Scullin Steel F.C.	1
PA	McKee Sports F.C.	2
PA	Pittsburgh Terminal	1
MI	Rising Star F.C.	1
MI	Packard F.C.	2
MI	Caledonia F.C.	8
MI	Pontiac City	0
OH	Bricklayers	1
OH	Goodyear Tire F.C.	3
NY	Moose F.C.	3
NY	McNaughton Rangers	1
MA	Fore River	3
MA	J&P Coats	1
MA	United Shoe F.C.	3
CT	New Haven	1
NJ	Babcock & Wilcox	0
NY	Newburg Shipyards F.C.	1
NY	New York F.C.	2
NJ	Erie A.A.	1
NY	Robins Dry Dock	3
NY	Tebo Yacht Basin	1
MA	Lynn Thistles	0
MA	Fall River Rovers	2
PA	Bethlehem Steel	1
NJ	New York Ship F.C.	0
CT	Bridgeport City F.C.	0
PA	Wanderers F.C.	4

Fourth round Feb 6–Mar 28
IL	Bricklayers and Masons F.C.	1
IL	Olympia F.C.	2
MO	Ben Millers	3
PA	McKee Sports F.C.	2
MI	Packard F.C.	3
MI	Caledonia F.C.	2
OH	Goodyear Tire F.C.	1
NY	Moose F.C.	2
MA	Fore River	3
MA	United Shoe F.C.	0
NY	Newburg Shipyards F.C.	1
NY	New York F.C.	2
NY	Robins Dry Dock	4
MA	Fall River Rovers	0
PA	Bethlehem Steel	10
PA	Wanderers F.C.	0

Quarterfinals; April 4–23
IL	Olympia F.C.	1
MO	Ben Millers	2
MI	Packard F.C.	5
NY	Moose F.C.	1
MA	Fore River	3
NY	New York F.C.	0
NY	Robins Dry Dock	1
PA	Bethlehem Steel	0

Semifinals; April 10,25
MO	Ben Millers	4
MI	Packard F.C.	2
MA	Fore River	2
NY	Robins Dry Dock	1

Final; May 9
MO	Ben Millers	2
MA	Fore River	1

(*): replay after tied match
w/o: walkover/forfeit victory awarded

== Semifinal ==
April 25, 1920

Ben Millers (MO)	4–2	Packard F.C. (MI)
Potee (pen.); Riley (???), 65'	Report	Johnston 40' (o.g.); Hunter 43'

Handlan's Park, St. Louis, Missouri
Attendance: 5,000
Referee: Kavanaugh

== Final ==
May 9, 1920
3:44 PM

Ben Millers (MO)	2–1	Fore River (MA)
Marre 22'; Dunn 62'	Report	Kershaw 37'

Handlan's Park, St. Louis, Missouri
Attendance: 12,000
Referee: Alex McKenzie, Chicago (USA)

== See also ==
- 1920 American Cup
