= 1919–20 American Cup =

Soccer tournament

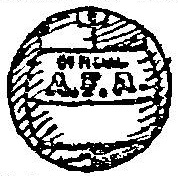

Tournament details
- Country: United States
- Dates: October 1919 – May 1920

Final positions
- Champions: Robins Dry Dock (1st title)
- Runners-up: Bethlehem Steel Works

The 1920 American Cup was the annual challenge cup held by the American Football Association. The A.F.A. officials were president Duncan Carswell of Orange, vice–president Donald McMillan of East Newark, recording secretary James Gulletly of Kearny, and financial secretary/treasurer Andrew N. Beveridge of Kearny, NJ with the advisory board made up of William Patrick, Harry Craig, Hector MacDonald, Andrew M. Brown and Donald MacMillan. Bethlehem Steel had their streak of four straight American Cup wins broken this year by Robins Dry Dock of Brooklyn. The shipbuilders defeated the steelworkers 1–0 in the final on May 2 at Harrison, New Jersey.

== First round ==
The first round draw took place October 4, 1919 in Newark, NJ. In this year's tournament, district groupings were maintained until the semifinal round to further reduce travel for the teams involved. The following teams drew byes: American A.A., Bethlehem Steel, Bridgeport City, Celtic (New Bedford), Clan MacDuff (New York), Crescent, Disston (Tacony), Erie, Fairlawn (Pawtucket), Federal Shipbuilding (Kearny), Fore River (Quincy), General Electric (Lynn), Germantown Boys Club, Haledon Thistle, J. & P. Coats (Pawtucket), Malta, Morse Dry Dock, New York, Parcell Rovers, Paterson, Robins Dry Dock, Rovers (Bridgeport), Thistle (Bridgeport), Wanderers (Philadelphia), West New York Blues.

Connecticut District
No games

New England District

October 18, 1919

St. Michael's	1–0	Yankee Boys
Bouchard (pk)

Athletic grounds, Fall River
Attendance: 500
Referee: Pemberton
October 25, 1919

Fall River Rovers	4–1	Crompton
5' Booth (og); 30', 50', 75' Pilkington; 44' Martin

Athletic grounds, Fall River
Attendance: 1000
Referee: Hayden (East Newark)
October 25, 1919

Greystone	7–2	Rangers
Cunliffe (3); Justice (pk); Holt (3)		Steele (2)

Centredale grounds
Referee: Pemberton

New Jersey District

October 19, 1919

Bunker Hill	3–0	Edison
Hennie Deickman; Inglis; Van Geisen

Olympic Park, Paterson, NJ
Referee: McDonald
October 19, 1919

Babcock & Wilcox	0–4	Victor
		30' Wyllie; Pettigrew; McCallum; Wyllie

Home Park, Bayonne, NJ
Referee: Frank Smith

New York District

October 19, 1919

Longfellows	1–1	Newburgh Shipyards
15' Lomas		Murdock Jamison

Ridgewood baseball grounds, Brooklyn

replay

October 26, 1919

Newburgh Shipyards	2–0	Longfellows
75' Sam Jamieson (pk); 84' Murdock Jamieson

Desmond Park, Newburgh, NY
Referee: M. DeGroff (NFA)

Pennsylvania District

October 19, 1919

Merchant Shipbuilding	1–1	J. & J. Dobson
75' Nolan		35' Finnegan

Ball Park, Harriman, PA
Referee: George Young

replay

October 25, 1919

J. & J. Dobson	1–4	Merchant Shipbuilding
Aleck Brown		28', 55' Nolan; Satterthwaite; 86' Rooney

Northeast High School Field
Referee: George Young

== Second round ==
The second round matches were due to be played on or before November 9.

Connecticut/New York District

November 1919

Bridgeport Thistle	W–L	Bridgeport Rovers

Bridgeport, CT
November 9, 1919

New York	5–0	Bridgeport City
5', 20' Bleich; Sweeney (2); 7', 1H' Hunziker

Lenox Oval
Referee: T. Findley
November 23, 1919

Clan MacDuff	0–2	Robins Dry Dock
		65' McGuire; Shanholt

Morse Oval, Brooklyn, NY
Referee: T. Cunningham
November 23, 1919

Newburgh Shipyards	1–2	Morse Dry Dock
70' Hughie McDonald		55' Lynch; 86' Parker

Desmond Park, Newburgh, NY
Referee: William McKinstrie

New England District

November 8, 1919

J. & P. Coats	3–1	General Electric
27' Hadfield (og); 60' Howarth; 72', 79' Haigh

Coats Field, Pawtucket, RI
Referee: Pemberton
November 8, 1919

Fall River Rovers	4–0	Greystone
5', 2H' Martin; 15', 65' Pilkington

Athletic grounds, Fall River, MA
Attendance: 2000
Referee: Heywood
November 8, 1919

Fore River	3–1	New Bedford Celtic
26', 80' Kershaw; Paige		11' Parker

Quincy, MA
Referee: B. Robertson
November 22, 1919

St. Michaels	3–0	Fairlawn Rovers
47' Art Greenslade; 69' Tommy Grey; 87' Adams

Athletic grounds, Fall River, MA
Attendance: 1000
Referee: Heywood

New Jersey District

November 9, 1919

Haledon Thistle	3–2	Crescent

Olympic Park, Paterson, NJ
November 9, 1919

Paterson	6–0	Victor
10', 12', 50' Heminsley; 13' Shaw; 28', 65' Brown

Olympic Park, Paterson, NJ
Referee: Charles Ward
November 9, 1919

Erie	6–0	Bunker Hill
Tom Stark (2); Brierley; Koelsch; Neilson; Knowles

Clark's Field, East Newark
Referee: Charles Pierson
November 9, 1919

Federal Shipbuilding	4–0	West NY Blues
Ward (2); McDonald (2)

Clark's Field, East Newark
Referee: Charles Pierson
November 16, 1919

American A.A.	1–3	Malta
Brown		Sherlock (3)

Clark's Field, East Newark
Referee: G. Pearson

Pennsylvania District

November 8, 1919

Disston	2–1	Merchant Shipbuilding
Cleary; 75' Andrews		Nolan

Disston Ball Park
Referee: John Walders
November 8, 1919

Wanderers	2–0	Parcell Rovers
J. McGhee (2)

Hess–Bright grounds
Referee: Pat Gunn
November 8, 1919

Germantown Boys Club	1–6	Bethlehem Steel
Spencer		Forrest (2); Pepper; McKelvey; Harris (2)

Germantown Boys Club
Referee: Dan Oates

== Third round ==
The draw for the third round was held November 15 in Newark, NJ. Matches were due to be played on or before November 30. The Haledon/Federal match was protested and ordered replayed. Haledon forfeited the replay.

Connecticut/New York District

December 7, 1919

Robins Dry Dock	5–4	New York
15' Miller; Ratican; Shanholt; 55', 80' Garside		Edwards 2 Kelly (pk); Hunziker

Todd Field, Brooklyn
Referee: Thomas Finley
December 14, 1919

Bridgeport Thistle	1–8	Morse Dry Dock
		Connie Lynch (5); Stradan; O'Donnell; Coles

Bridgeport, CT

New England District

November 29, 1919

Fore River	0–0	St. Michaels

Quincy, MA
Referee: T. Robertson (Quincy)
March 27, 1920

Fall River Rovers	4–2	J. & P. Coats
Booth (pk); Howarth; Pilkington; Howarth		20' Rockley; Holgate (pk)

Athletic grounds, Fall River, MA
Attendance: 2375
Referee: Pemberton (Pawtucket)

replay

December 6, 1919

St. Michaels	1–5	Fore River
35' Rego		43' Tom Underwood; 55', 56' Kershaw; 70' Daley; 81' Page

Athletic grounds, Fall River, MA
Attendance: 1100
Referee: Heywood

New Jersey District

December 7, 1919

Haledon Thistle	3–2	Federal Shipbuilding
48' Barclay; 70' Henderson; Stussi		10' Cullerton; Richardson

Olympic Park, Paterson, NJ
Attendance: 500
Referee: Charles Ward
December 7, 1919

Erie	10–2	Malta
Koelsch (4); Stark; Ingeram; Neilson; Brierley		Durkin; Costello

Clark's Field, East Newark
Referee: A. Pearson

replay

December 25, 1919

Federal Shipbuilding	w/o	Haledon Thistle

Clark's Field, East Newark

Pennsylvania District

November 29, 1919

Disston	0–4	Bethlehem Steel
Rodgers (og)		Pepper; Harris; Fleming

Tacony Baseball Park
Referee: James Walder
November 30, 1919

Paterson	1–0	Wanderers
50' Cooper

Olympic Park, Paterson, NJ
Referee: Charles Ward

== Fourth round ==

The fourth round matches were due to be played on or before December 28. The Morse/Robins game was protested and ordered replayed on account Kershaw of Morse Dry Dock was ineligible.

January 10, 1920

Bethlehem Steel	5–0	Federal Shipbuilding
25' Harris; Forrest (2); Fleming; Sundberg

Athletic Field, Bethlehem, PA
Referee: J.H. Carpenter
January 11, 1920

Morse Dry Dock	1–0	Robins Dry Dock
20' Joseph Kershaw

Morse Oval, Brooklyn
Attendance: 3000
Referee: T. Cunningham
January 11, 1920

Erie	1–1	Paterson
20' Rodgers		27' Todd (pk)

Clark's Field, East Newark
Referee: Finlay
April 17, 1920

Fall River Rovers	1–3	Fore River
Pilkington		10', 20' Underwood; 25' Farquhar

Athletic ground, Fall River
Attendance: 3000
Referee: Edward Pemberton (Pawtucket)

replays

January 18, 1920

Erie	1–0	Paterson
102' Del Brierley

Clark's Field, East Newark
Referee: T. Finlay
March 28, 1920

Morse Dry Dock	1–2	Robins Dry Dock
40' Lennon; 55' McGuire		10' Miller

Morse Oval, Brooklyn
Attendance: 3000
Referee: T. Cunningham

== Semifinals ==

March 28, 1920

Erie	1–5	Bethlehem Steel
46' Archie Stark		20' Fleming (pk); 25' Fleming; 27' Fleming; 58' Murray; McKelvey

Federal Baseball Park, Harrison
Attendance: 5000
Referee: George Young (Philadelphia)
April 24, 1920

Fore River	0–2	Robins Dry Dock
		34' Bob Millar; 83' Garside

Coats Field, Pawtucket, RI
Attendance: 8000
Referee: Edward Pemberton (Pawtucket)

== Final ==

The American Cup final took place at Federal Baseball Park in Harrison, NJ. Bethlehem and Robins had met in the quarterfinals of the National Cup with Robins prevailing. Although Robins lost in the semifinal to Fore River, they reversed the result in the American semifinal. A further consolation for Robins was their triumph over eventual National Cup winners, Ben Miller, when visiting St. Louis earlier in the season.

May 2, 1920
3:30 PM EST

Robins Dry Dock	1-0	Bethlehem Steel
63' Tommy Murphy (O.G.)

Federal Baseball Park, Harrison, New Jersey
Attendance: 7,000
Referee: George Lambie

== Champions ==

Robins Dry Dock American Cup champions 1919–20.

Upper row, left to right - W. Burrows (trainer), J.P. Bulger (assistant trainer), H. Rodden, J. Robertson, Neil Clarke, P. Renzulli, W. Brownlie, F. Lance, J. Van Deneyden and Hugh Monaghan (assistant trainer).
Lower row- J. Drysdale (manager), E. Garside, J. McGuire, E.J. Smith (director), Harry J. Ratican, Bob Millar (captain) and H. Shanholtz.

== See also ==
- 1919–20 National Challenge Cup
- 1919–20 National Association Foot Ball League season
- 1919–20 Southern New England Soccer League season
