= 1918–19 National Challenge Cup =

American soccer tournament season

- Dewar Challenge Cup

Tournament details
- Country: United States
- Dates: November 10, 1918 – April 19, 1919

Final positions
- Champions: Bethlehem Steel (4th title)
- Runners-up: Paterson F.C.
- Semifinalists: Morse Dry Dock; Bricklayers and Masons

Tournament statistics
- Matches played: 2-0

The 1918–19 National Challenge Cup was the sixth National Challenge cup held by the United States Football Association. Bethlehem Steel won their fourth title in a 2–0 victory over Paterson F.C.

== Bracket ==
Home teams listed on top of bracket

Second Round; Nov 10-Dec 25
PA | Bethlehem Steel | 4
PA | Merchant Ship "A" | 3
PA | Homestead F.C. | w/o
PA | Pittsburgh F.C.
OH | Goodyear Rubber F.C. | 8
OH | Goodrich F.C. | 1
OH | Magyar-American F.C. | 1-3
OH | Hydraulic Pressed | 1-2
IL | Bricklayers and Masons | 1
IL | Lincoln Park F.C. | 0
IL | Scottish Americans F.C. | 5
IL | Harvey F.C. | 2
MI | Detroit F.C. | w/o
MI | Corinthian F.C.
MI | Roses F.C. | 4
MI | Solway F.C. | 0
NJ | Jersey A.C. | 2
NJ | Paterson F.C. | 9
NY | Robins Dry Dock | 2
CT | Bridgeport City F.C. | 1
MA | Merrimac Valley F.C. | 0
MA | Fore River | 6
RI | J&P Coats | 6
RI | Olneyville F.C. | 0
NY | Morse Dry Dock | w/o
NY | New York Chinese
NJ | Kearny Federal Ship | 2-3
PA | Merchant Ship "B" | 1-2
NJ | Scottish-American | 6
NJ | Tietjen & Lang | 0
NY | New York F.C. | w/o
CT | Viking F.C.

Third Round; Dec 21-Jan 12
PA | Bethlehem Steel | w/o
PA | Homestead F.C.
OH | Goodyear Rubber F.C. | 6
OH | Magyar-American F.C. | 1
IL | Bricklayers and Masons | 2
IL | Scottish Americans F.C. | 0
MI | Detroit F.C. | 3
MI | Roses F.C. | 4
NJ | Paterson F.C. | 2-3*
NY | Robins Dry Dock | 1-1
MA | Fore River | 4
RI | J&P Coats | 1
NY | Morse Dry Dock | 0-5
NJ | Kearny Federal Ship | 0-3
NJ | Scottish-Americans | 0
NY | New York F.C. | 2

Quarterfinals; Feb 21-Mar 9
PA | Bethlehem Steel | 5
OH | Goodyear Rubber F.C. | 0
IL | Bricklayers and Masons | 5
MI | Roses F.C. | 2
NJ | Paterson F.C. | 0-2*
MA | Fore River | 0-1
NY | Morse Dry Dock | 2
NY | New York F.C. | 0

Semifinals; March 29,30
PA | Bethlehem Steel | 5
IL | Bricklayers and Masons | 0
NJ | Paterson F.C. | 4
NY | Morse Dry Dock | 1

Final; April 19
PA | Bethlehem Steel | 2
NJ | Paterson F.C. | 0

(*) replay after tied match
w/o walkover/forfeit victory awarded

== Final ==
April 19, 1919

| Bethlehem Steel (PA) | 2–0 | Paterson F.C. (NJ) |
|---|---|---|
| McKelvey 60'; Ratican 88' | Report |

Athletic Field, Fall River, Massachusetts
Attendance: 10,000
Referee: George Lambie (USA)

== See also ==
- 1919 American Cup

== Sources ==
- USOpenCup.com
- U.S. Soccer History - 1919
