= 1918–19 National Association Foot Ball League season =

National Association Foot Ball League
- Season: 1918–19
- Champion(s): Bethlehem Steel (1st title)
- Matches: 30

Statistics of National Association Foot Ball League in season 1918/1919.

Philadelphia and Brooklyn joined the league prior to the season while Bayonne Babcok & Wilcox withdrew following its conclusion.

== League standings ==
| Position | Team | Pts | Pld | W | L | T | GF | GA |
|---|---|---|---|---|---|---|---|---|
| 1 | Bethlehem Steel | 19 | 10 | 9 | 1 | 0 | 37 | 4 |
| 2 | Philadelphia Merchant Ship | 11 | 10 | 4 | 3 | 3 | 19 | 14 |
| 3 | Paterson F.C. | 11 | 10 | 5 | 1 | 4 | 19 | 17 |
| 4 | Brooklyn Robins Dry Dock | 8 | 10 | 3 | 2 | 5 | 17 | 20 |
| 5 | New York F.C. | 7 | 10 | 2 | 3 | 5 | 13 | 21 |
| 6 | Bayonne Babcock & Wilcox | 4 | 10 | 1 | 2 | 7 | 14 | 33 |
