= 1918–19 American Cup =

Soccer tournament

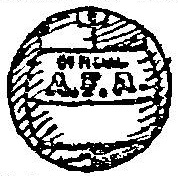

Tournament details
- Country: United States
- Dates: October 1918 – April 1919
- Teams: 25

Final positions
- Champions: Bethlehem Steel Works (5th title)
- Runners-up: Paterson F.C.

The 1919 American Cup was the annual challenge cup held by the American Football Association. At the A.F.A.'s annual meeting at the Continental Hotel in Newark, NJ the delegates elected were president Duncan Carswell of Orange, vice–president Donald McMillan of East Newark, recording secretary James Galletly of Kearny, and financial secretary/treasurer Andrew N. Beveridge of Kearny, NJ. Twenty-five teams entered the competition. Bethlehem Steel Works won the trophy for the fourth straight time and fifth overall.

== First round ==
The draw for the first round was held October 5, 1918 at the Continental Hotel in Newark, NJ. The first-round games were scheduled to be completed by October 27. Scottish American, Jersey A.C., Bridgeport City, Clan MacDuff, and Merchant Shipbuilding of Bristol drew byes. The New York/Paterson match was protested on account of ending seven minutes early and a replay was ordered.

New York, New Jersey, Connecticut District

October 26, 1918

American A.A.	0–1	Robins Dry Dock
		20' Jimmy Hayes

Clark's Field, East Newark
Referee: James Rowley (East Newark)
November 3, 1918

Morse Dry Dock	1–0	Kinley
88' Bell

Morse Oval, Brooklyn
Referee: G. Caldicott
November 3, 1918

Paterson F.C.	1–2	New York F.C.
2H' Brown (pk)		10', 20' Petrie

Olympic Park, Paterson, NJ
Referee: Andrew Laurie (Newark)
November 10, 1918

Federal Shipbuilding	6–1	Standard Shipbuilding
10' Miller; 15' Peter Sweeney; 1H' Clark; 2H' Peter Sweeney (4)

Bayonne, NJ
Attendance: 300
Referee: John Cunningham
December 1, 1918

Babcock & Wilcox	w/o	Bridgeport Swedish

December 8, 1918

Bunker Hill	w/o	Tietjen & Lang

Olympic Park, Paterson, NJ

replay

December 7, 1918

Paterson F.C.	3–1	New York F.C.
1H' Hunziker; 2H' Brown; Stark		2H' Ferguson (pk)

Olympic Park, Paterson, NJ
Referee: Walders (Philadelphia)

New England District

November 9, 1918

J.&P. Coats	1–0	Fisk Red Top
35' Carroll

Lonsdale Av Grounds, Pawtucket
Attendance: 1400
Referee: Pemberton (Pawtucket)
November 9, 1918

Fore River	0–0	Pan American

Athletic Grounds, Quincy, MA
Attendance: 800
Referee: George Lambie

replay

November 30, 1918

Fore River	2–1	Pan American
7' Stradan; 87' Kershaw		30' Cross

Athletic Grounds, Quincy, MA
Referee: George Lambie

Pennsylvania District

November 9, 1918

Disston A.A.	3–1	Hog Island Shipbuilding
Haggerty (2); 20' Eastwood		McGhee

Disston Ball Park, Tacony
Referee: James Walders
November 9, 1918

Pusey & Jones	1–2	Merchants Shipbuilding B
60' Frankie Brown		30' Aleck Brown; Matthew Barrett

Philadelphia, PA
Referee: Levi Wilcox
December 7, 1918

Bethlehem Steel Works	2–0	New York Shipbuilding
32' Forrest; 2H' Fleming

Athletic Field, Bethlehem, PA
Referee: Robert Scott

== Second round ==
The draw for the second round was held November 9, 1918 at the Continental hotel in Newark, NJ. Matches were due to be played on or before December 15.

New York, New Jersey, Connecticut District

December 8, 1918

Babcock & Wilcox	4–0	Jersey A.C.
10' Muir; 1H', 60', 2H' Holden

B. & W. Grounds, Bayonne, NJ
Referee: Russell
December 15, 1918

Bridgeport City	2–3	Federal Shipbuilding
10' Satterwaite; 1H' Billie Shaw		Carroll; Ingram; 81' MacLaughlin

Meadows, Bridgeport, CT
Referee: George Denholm (Ansonia)
December 15, 1918

Robins Dry Dock	4–0	Clan MacDuff
Garside; Mitchell (2); 60' Munro

Todd Field, Brooklyn
Referee: T. Cunningham
December 15, 1918

Paterson	6–2	Bunker Hill
20' Blaisch; Hunziker (3); Brown (pk); Stark		Van Geison (2)

Olympic Park, Paterson
Referee: Charles Ward
December 15, 1918

Morse Dry Dock	w/o	Scottish American

McGolderick's Field, Greenpoint
Referee: Connelly

New England District

December 28, 1918

Fore River	3–2	J. & P. Coats
30' Paige; 1H' Stradan		7' Harvey; 2H' Carroll; 2H' Smith

Quincy, MA
Attendance: 216
Referee: Robertson

Pennsylvania District

December 14, 1918

Bethlehem Steel	6–2	Merchants Shipbuilding B
1' Whitey Fleming; 20' Ratican; Pepper; 55' Bob Millar; 75' Forrest; 77' McKelvey		44', 75' J. Wilson

Bethlehem, PA
Referee: George Young
December 14, 1918

Disston A.A.	0–1	Merchants Shipbuilding A
		2H' Burnett (pk)

Tacony Ball Park
Referee: James Walders

== Third round ==
The draw for the third round was held December 28, 1918 at the Continental hotel in Newark, NJ. Merchants Shipbuilding A team fielded an ineligible player and was required to replay their match with J. & P. Coats.

January 25, 1919

Merchants Shipbuilding A	4–1	J. & P. Coats
5' Maxwell; Danny Coursey; Heminsley; 46' Percy Hardy		Todd

Disston Ball Park, Tacony
Referee: George Young
January 26, 1919

Federal Shipbuilding	0–2	Bethlehem Steel
		15' McKelvey; 83' Fleming

Clark's Field, East Newark
Attendance: 2500
Referee: Thomas Cunningham (New York)
February 2, 1919

Babcock & Wilcox	1–1	Robins Dry Dock
55' Elliott		5' Jimmy Hayes

B. & W. Grounds, Bayonne, NJ
February 9, 1919

Paterson	5–1	Morse Dry Dock
3' Alex Stark; 46' Rudy Hunziker; Rudy Hunziker; Blaisch; 88' Blaisch		Beardsworth

Olympic Park, Paterson, NJ
Referee: Charles Ward (Passaic)

replays

February 9, 1919

Robins Dry Dock	2–0	Babcock & Wilcox
20', 1H' Coleman

Todd Field, Brooklyn, NY
March 1, 1919

J. & P. Coats	0–4	Merchants Shipbuilding A
		37' Duggan; 39' Hyslop (pk); 71' Burnett; Duggan

Coats Field, Pawtucket, RI
Attendance: 2000
Referee: Edward Pemberton (Pawtucket)

== Semifinals ==
March 16, 1919

Bethlehem Steel	3–2	Robins Dry Dock
70' Fleming; 2H', 83' Ratican		5', 2H' Duffy

Athletic Field, Bethlehem, PA
Attendance: 1500
Referee: Charles E. Creighton (New York)
March 23, 1919

Paterson	3–2	Merchant Shipbuilding A
28', 47' Archie Stark; Blaisch		18' Fidler; 85' Duggan

Olympic Park, Paterson, NJ
Attendance: 3000
Referee: Thomas Cunningham

== Final ==
The American Cup final took place at Disston Ball Park in Tacony, PA. Bethlehem Steel entered the final with 22 wins 2 ties and 1 loss with 81 goals scored and 17 against. Paterson won 16 tied 4 and lost 5 with 52 goals scored and 30 against. Bethlehem and Paterson were engaging in a virtual replay of the National Challenge Cup final played in Fall River the week prior. The result of both finals was 2–0 in favor of Bethlehem. Bethlehem won a third title in the season by finishing first in the National League followed by Paterson.

April 26, 1919
4:00 PM EST

Paterson F.C.	0–2	Bethlehem Steel
		11' Paddy Butler; 68' Harry Ratican

Tacony, Pennsylvania
Attendance: 3000
Referee: George Young

== See also ==
- 1919 National Challenge Cup
- 1918–19 National Association Foot Ball League season
