= Brooklyn Robins Dry Dock =

Brooklyn Robins
- Full name: Brooklyn Robins Dry Dock
- Nickname: Robins
- Founded: 1918
- Dissolved: 1921; 105 years ago
- Ground: Red Hook, Brooklyn
- Owner: Todd Pacific Shipyards
- League: NAFBL
- 1920–21: 3rd.

The Brooklyn Robins Dry Dock were an American soccer team which took its name from the workplace it represented, the Robins Dry Dock and Repair Company. The dock was owned by the Todd Pacific Shipyards in Red Hook, Brooklyn, who formed the professional soccer club in 1918 to play in the National Association Football League.

Robins played until the league folded in 1921. Robins best finish was third in 1920 and 1921, but won the 1921 National Challenge Cup.

== League ==
In 1918, the entry of the United States into World War I had led to a drain on players due to military service. The loss of players impacted most league, including the NAFBL. While most teams in the league were able to find enough players to begin the season, three teams were forced to sit out the season. A fourth, the East Newark Scots-Americans, began the season but folded after five games. In order to maintain enough teams to stage a competitive season, the NAFBL brought in the Robins Dry Dock which assumed the Scots-Americans record.

While Robins was unable to finish higher than third in its three seasons in the NAFBL, it quickly became dominant in national competitions. In 1921, the top teams of the NAFBL collapsed when the league’s top teams joined with the top teams of the Southern New England Soccer League to form the American Soccer League. Robins did not join the ASL. Instead, Todd Shipyards, the parent company of Robins Dry Dock, as well as Tebo Yacht Basin which sponsored the Tebo Yacht Basin F.C. of the SENSL, entered its own team in the new league.

== Cup winner ==
At the time there were two national cups, the long running American Cup and the recently established National Challenge Cup. In March 1919, Robins went to the semifinals of the American Cup, falling to Bethlehem Steel F.C. In 1920, Robins took its revenge on Bethlehem when it defeated the Steelmen in the American Cup final.

Robins repeated as cup champions the next year as well, defeating Fore River. In the 1920 National Challenge Cup, Robins lost to Fore River in the semifinals. The next year, Robins took the Challenge Cup in a 4-3 victory over St. Louis Scullin Steel F.C.

== Year-by-year ==
Year	League	Record	Standing	American Cup	National Cup
1918–19	NAFBL	3-2-5	4th	Semifinal	Third round
1919–20	NAFBL	10-2-2	3rd	Champion	Semifinal
1920–21	NAFBL	5-5-2	3rd	Champion	Champion
