= Harrison S.C. =

American soccer team

Harrison Soccer Club, also referred to as Harrison F.C., was an American soccer club founded as the amateur Erie Athletic Association Football Club that played in the National Association Foot Ball League. As Erie A.A., the club was based in Kearny, New Jersey. In 1921, the club changed its name to Harrison S.C. when it became a founding member of the professional American Soccer League and played its home matches at Harrison Field. The team won the New Jersey State Cup in 1920 and 1922.

== Year-by-year ==
Year	Division	League	Reg. season	Playoffs	American Cup	National Cup
1919/20	N/A	NAFBL	2nd	No playoff	Semifinals	Third round
1920/21	N/A	NAFBL	5th	No playoff	Not held	Fourth round
1921/22	1	ASL	4th	No playoff	?	Quarterfinals
1922/23	1	ASL	7th	No playoff	?	Did not enter

== Notes and references ==
Bibliography

- Jose, Colin (1998). The American Soccer League: The Golden Years of American Soccer 1921-1931. Lanham, Maryland: Scarecrow Press. ISBN 978-0810834293.
- Cahill, Thomas W., ed. (1921). Spalding's Official "Soccer" Football Guide 1921-22. Spalding's "Red Cover" Series of Athletic Handbooks, No. 55R. New York: American Sports Publishing Company.
- Cahill, Thomas W., ed. (1922). Spalding's Official "Soccer" Football Guide 1922-23. Spalding's "Red Cover" Series of Athletic Handbooks, No. 55R. New York: American Sports Publishing Company.

Footnotes
