= Tebo Yacht Basin F.C. =

Tebo Yacht Basin
- Full name: Tebo Yacht Basin Football Club
- Founded: 1918
- Dissolved: 1921

Tebo Yacht Basin was an amateur U.S. soccer team sponsored by the Tebo Yacht Basin company of Brooklyn, New York. It had a brief impact on the U.S. soccer scene from 1918 to 1921.

In the fall of 1918, Tebo was drawn with Vikings in the first round of the National Challenge Cup. At the time, they played in the Metropolitan League in New York City. In 1920, they moved to the New York State Football League and gained national prominence with a series of cup and league titles. In 1921, they won the Southern New York State Football Association cup, the La Sultana Cup and the New York State League titles. They also lost in the semi-finals of the 1921 National Challenge Cup. One of the strongest clubs in the region, the team initially intended to enter the American Soccer League which was established in 1921. However, the Tebo Yacht Basin company was a subsidiary of the Todd Shipyard company which decided to enter its own team in the new league. Therefore, Todd Shipyards merged Tebo Yacht Basin F.C. with another club sponsored by a corporate subsidiary Brooklyn Robins Dry Dock to form the Todd Shipyards club. This led the disbandment of Tebo Yacht Basin F.C.
