= Todd Shipyards (soccer) =

Todd Shipyards F.C.
- Full name: Todd Shipyards Football Club
- Founded: 1921
- Dissolved: 1922
- Stadium: Todd Shipyards Athletic Field; Brooklyn
- League: American Soccer League
- 1921-22: 3rd

Todd Shipyards F.C. was an American soccer club based in Brooklyn, New York that was an inaugural member of the American Soccer League. The team was formed when the Todd Shipyard company decided to merge the Brooklyn Robins Dry Dock with Tebo Yacht Basin F.C.

== Year-by-year ==
Year	Division	League	Reg. season	Playoffs	U.S. Open Cup
1921-22	1	ASL	3rd	No playoff	Final
