= Bethlehem Steel F.C. (1907–1930) =

- Full name: Bethlehem Steel Football Club
- Nickname: Steelworkers
- Founded: 1907; 119 years ago (as "Bethlehem F.C.")
- Dissolved: 1930; 96 years ago
- Stadium: Bethlehem Steel Athletic Field at Moravian College in Bethlehem, Pennsylvania, U.S.
- League: American Soccer League
Home colors

Bethlehem Steel Football Club (1907–1930) was one of the most successful early American soccer clubs. Known as the Bethlehem Football Club from 1907 until 1915 when it became the Bethlehem Steel Football Club, the team was sponsored by the Bethlehem Steel corporation. Bethlehem Steel FC played their home games first at East End Field in Bethlehem, Pennsylvania, in the Lehigh Valley, then later on the grounds Bethlehem Steel built on Elizabeth Ave named Bethlehem Steel Athletic Field.

== History ==
The first soccer team in Bethlehem was founded in 1904, according to a June 2, 1925, article in The Bethlehem Globe. The sport took hold of the town and local steel workers formed a recreational team.

On November 17, 1907, the Bethlehem Football Club played its first official match, an 11–2 loss to West Hudson A.A., at the time one of the top professional teams in the country.

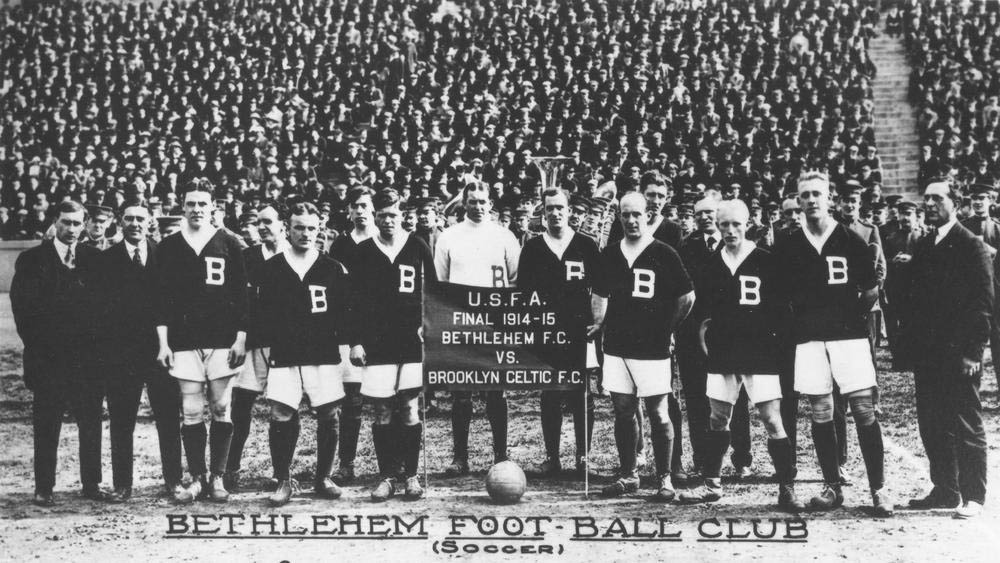
Bethlehem Steel F.C. prior to its final game of the 1914–15 season against Brooklyn Celtic

In 1913, the steel company created Bethlehem Steel Athletic Field, the country's first soccer field with stadium-seating. In 1914 Charles Schwab, owner of the Steel Company, took the team professional, using his wealth to induce several top players to move to Bethlehem Steel and changing the team name to the Bethlehem Steel Football Club. Schwab would eventually begin importing players from Scotland and England. From 1911 to 1915, the club was a member of the amateur Allied American Foot Ball Association before moving to the American Soccer League of Philadelphia, another amateur league, for the 1915–1916 season.

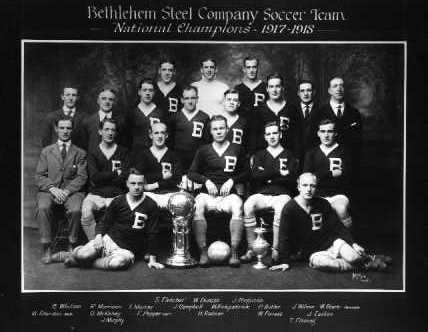
The Bethlehem Steel F.C. team that won the national title in 1917–18 season

Bethlehem Steel FC was not associated with a league from 1916 to 1917, playing only exhibition or cup games. In 1917, it joined the professional National Association Foot Ball League. In 1921, several teams from the NAFBL and other regional leagues joined to form the American Soccer League. Although one of the strongest teams of the time, the owners decided to disband the club, moving the players and management to Philadelphia where it competed as the Philadelphia Field Club.

Legendary Scottish football player Alex Jackson, played for Bethlehem Steel. Although Philadelphia won the first ASL championship, the team was in financial trouble and lacked fan support. The ownership moved it back to Bethlehem the following year, and the team restored their initial name.

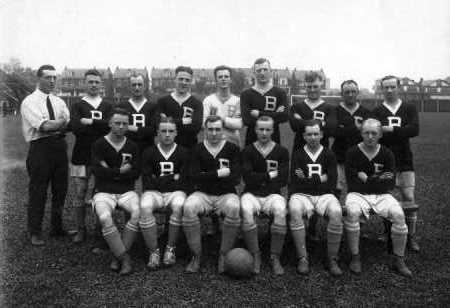
Bethlehem Steel FC, c. July 1921

In 1925, the ASL, including Bethlehem Steel F.C., boycotted the National Challenge Cup. The boycott created some animosity with the United States Football Association. Three years later, in 1928, the ASL again boycotted the Challenge Cup. When Bethlehem Steel chose to ignore the boycott this time, the league expelled them.

In 1925 - 1926 Bethlehem Steel F.C. was awarded the United States Football Association Medal. Patrick McColgan, from, Old Kilpatrick, Scotland had travelled to Philadelphia to help establish the team. His name is on the medal.

Under the leadership of the USFA, Bethlehem Steel and two other expelled teams joined with teams from the Southern New York State Soccer Association to create the Eastern Soccer League. These actions, part of the 1928–1929 "Soccer Wars", along with the Great Depression, financially devastated the ASL, ESL and Bethlehem Steel FC. While Bethlehem Steel FC rejoined the ASL in 1929, the team folded after the spring 1930 season.

== Year-by-year ==
Season	Div.	League			National cups	
Season	Div.	Assoc.	Reg. season	Playoffs	Challenge Cup	American Cup
1911–12	N/A	AAFA (Note: "Allied American Foot Ball Association".)	N/A	Final	–	did not enter
1912–13	N/A	AAFA	1st	Champion (Note: No playoff since this season.)	–	did not enter
1913–14	N/A	AAFA	1st	Champion	Third round	Champion
1914–15	N/A	ALAFC	1st	Champion	Champion	Semifinal
1915–16	N/A	ALP	2nd	No playoff	Champion	Champion
1916–17	N/A	N/A	N/A	N/A	Runners-up	Champion
1917–18	N/A	NAFL	2nd	No playoff	Champion	Champion
1918–19	N/A	NAFL	1st	Champion	Champion	Champion
1919–20	N/A	NAFL	1st	Champion	Quarterfinal	Runners-up
1920–21	N/A	NAFL	1st	Champion	Second round	Semifinal
1921–22	(see Philadelphia Field Club)					
1922–23	1	ASL	2nd	No playoff	Forth round	Second round
1923–24	1	ASL	2nd	No playoff	Semifinals	Champion
1924–25	1	ASL	2nd	No playoff	did not enter	N/A
1925–26	1	ASL	4th	No playoff	Champion	N/A
1926–27	1	ASL	1st	Champion	East. Division	N/A
1927–28	1	ASL	2nd; 4th (Note: Positions on 1st half and 2nd half respectively.)	Semifinals	Second Round	N/A
1928–29	1	ASL	– (Note: withdrew after 6 games.)	N/A	N/A	N/A
1928–29	N/A	ESL	1st	Champion	Semifinals	N/A
1929	N/A	ESL	1st	Champion	N/A	N/A
1930	1	ACL (ASL)	7th (Spring)	No playoff	Semifinals	N/A

== Honors ==
=== Leagues ===
- Allied American Football Association
  - Winner (2): 1912–13, 1913–14
- ALAFC
  - Winner (1): 1914–15
- National Association Football League
  - Winner (3): 1918–19, 1919–20, 1920–21
  - Runner Up (1): 1917–18
- American Soccer League
  - Winner (1): 1926–27
  - Runner Up (3): 1922–23, 1923–24, 1924–25
- Eastern Professional Soccer League
  - Winner (2): 1928–29, 1929

=== National cups ===
- National Challenge Cup
  - Winner (5): 1914–15, 1915–16, 1917–18, 1918–19, 1925–26
  - Runner Up (1): 1916–17
- American Cup
  - Winner (6): 1914, 1916, 1917, 1918, 1919, 1924
  - Runner Up (1): 1920
- Lewis Cup
  - Winner (1): 1928
- Allied Amateur Cup
  - Winner (1): 1914
  - Runner Up (1): 1912

== Notable players ==
- Archie Stark, world record holder for the highest season scoring record with 67 goals in the 1924–25 season
- Alex Jackson, former Scotland international.

== Coaches ==
- Harry Trend: 1909
- Carpenter: 1913
- Jimmy Lawson: 1914
- William Sheridan: ?–1924
- Jimmy Easton: 1924–
- William Sheridan: 1930
