= 1925–26 National Challenge Cup =

American soccer competition

- Dewar Challenge Cup

Tournament details
- Country: United States
- Dates: 10 January – 11 April 1926

Final positions
- Champions: Bethlehem Steel (5th title)
- Runners-up: Ben Millers
- Semifinalists: Canadian Club; J&P Coats

The 1925–26 National Challenge Cup was the annual open cup held by the United States Football Association now known as the Lamar Hunt U.S. Open Cup.

== History ==
There were 131 entrants to the tournament. Twenty-five teams (12 western and 13 eastern) were exempt from the qualifying stages because of their relative strength. These included primarily the ASL and St. Louis Soccer League teams. The remaining 106 teams played off for the seven remaining spots in the first round proper. The preliminary qualifying round featured 44 matches with 18 teams receiving byes. Canadian teams were admitted because several outfits from Essex County, Ontario were affiliated with the Michigan Soccer Association which in turn was a member of the USFA.

== Eastern Division ==
First round
January 16 - New Bedford
New Bedford Whalers	5
Shawsheen Indians	0
January 16 - Pawtucket
J&P Coats	4
Abbot Worsted	1
January 17 - Tiverton
Fall River F.C.	3
Providence FC	2
January 16 - Boston
Boston Soccer Club	2
Fore River	1
January 17, 24 - New York
Brooklyn Wanderers	2-3
Indiana Flooring	2-2
January 17 - Bronx
New York Giants	9
Yonkers Thistle	1
January 17, 24 - Trenton
Trenton F.C.	3-1
Philadelphia Field Club	3-4
January 17 - Harrison
Newark Skeeters	1
Bethlehem Steel	5

Second round
February 20 - New Bedford
New Bedford Whalers	0
J&P Coats	1
February 14, 21 - Tiverton/Boston
Fall River F.C.	1-2
Boston SC	1-3
February 21, 28 - Brooklyn
Brooklyn Wanderers	2-1
New York Giants	2-5
February 13 - Philadelphia
Philadelphia Field Club	1
Bethlehem Steel	2

Semi-finals
February 28 - Tiverton
J&P Coats	5
Boston SC	3
March 14 - Brooklyn
New York Giants	1
Bethlehem Steel	2

Final
March 21 - Providence
J&P Coats	1
Bethlehem Steel	3

== Western Division ==
First round
January 17 - Cleveland
Cleveland Thistles	1
Clan MacKenzie	2
January 24 - St. Louis
Ben Millers	3
American-Hungarians	1
January 17 - St. Louis
Vesper Buick	7
Royalton Stars	2
January 10 - St. Louis
Pants Store F.C.	2
Wellston	1
January 17 - Detroit
Gar Wood F.C.	3
Canadian Club	4
January 17 - Chicago
Olympia F.C.	1
Thistles F.C.	0
January 17/ February 7
Kenosha Reds	2-0
Pullman F.C.	2-4
January 17, 24 - Chicago
Sparta ABA	1
Bricklayers	2

Second round
February 7 - Cleveland
Clan MacKenzie	2^{a}
Ben Millers	0
February 7 - St. Louis
Vesper Buick	6
Pants Store F.C.	2
February 7, 21 - Chicago
Canadian Club	1-6
Olympia F.C.	1-3
February 14 - Chicago
Pullman F.C.	3
Bricklayers	1

Semi-finals
March 7 - St. Louis
Ben Millers	2
Vesper Buick	0
March 1, 14, 21 - Chicago
Canadian Club	4^{b}
Pullman F.C.	1

Final
March 28 - St. Louis
Ben Millers	2
Canadian Club	0

a) disqualified after protest
b) aggregate after 3 games

== Final ==
April 11, 1926

Bethlehem Steel (PA)	7–2	Ben Millers (MO)
Stark 6', 20', 53'; Goldie 35'; Rollo 55'; McDonald 86'; Jaap 88'	Report	Nash 48', 70'

Ebbets Field, Brooklyn, New York
Attendance: 17,000
Referee: Thomas Cunningham (USA)
