= Mark's Stadium =

Soccer stadium in Rhode Island, USA

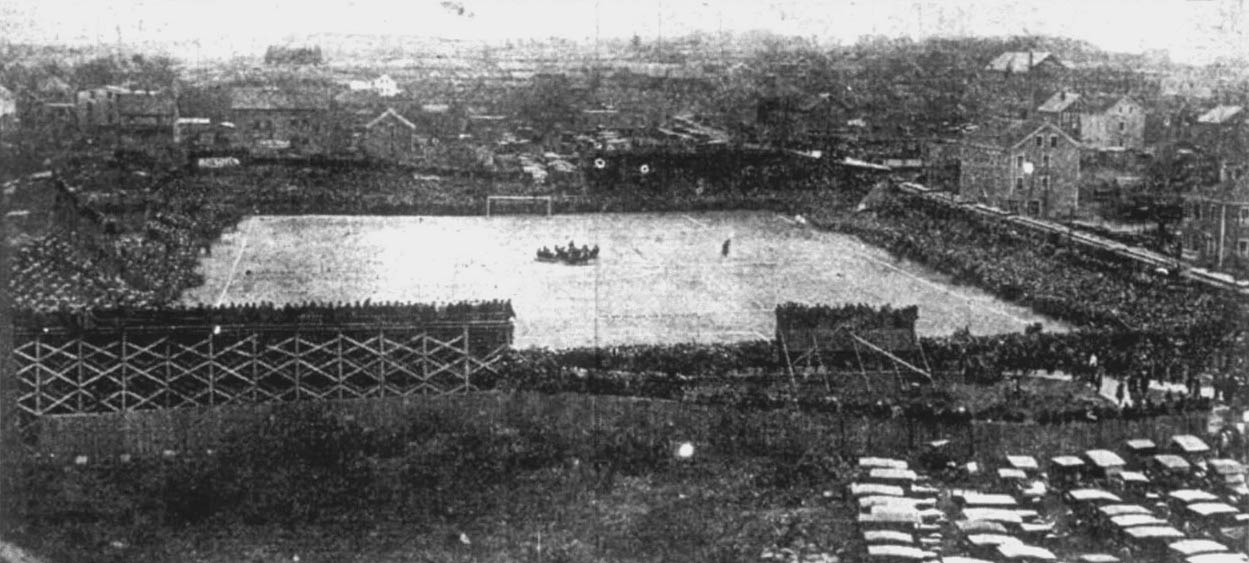
- The stadium during a match
- Interactive map of Mark's Stadium
- Full name: Mark's Stadium
- Former names: Ponta Delgada Racing Stadium
- Location: North Tiverton, Rhode Island; United States
- Coordinates: 41°40′14.16″N 71°10′48.22″W
- Owner: Sam Mark
- Capacity: 15,000
- Type: Soccer-specific stadium
- Current use: Soccer (1922–1950s); Baseball; Midget car racing (1939, 1945–47, 1952–53)

Construction
- Opened: 1922
- Closed: 1950s

Tenants
- Lewis Cup final (1925); U.S. Open Cup final (1925); Fall River F.C. (1922–31); Fall River F.C. (1932) (1931-19?); Ponta Delgada S.C. (?)

Mark's Stadium is a former soccer stadium located in North Tiverton, Rhode Island. During the 1920s and early 1930s it was the home of Fall River F.C., one of the era’s most successful soccer teams. It is one of the earliest examples of a soccer-specific stadium in the United States. The stadium also hosted the U.S. Open Cup final in 1925.

After the demise of the 'Marksmen', the stadium was used as a home ground by other local teams, most notably Fall River F.C. (1932) and Ponta Delgada S.C..

In 2009, the sports-related website Bleacher Report named the stadium "the 8th most important soccer site in the United States".

== History ==
In 1922 Sam Mark won the bid over the Fall River United/Rover joint bid to head the American Soccer League's Fall River franchise. Mark was willing to invest in the club and one of his first moves was to build the team its own stadium. He located it in North Tiverton, Rhode Island, just over the Massachusetts border from Fall River. This enabled the 'Marksmen' to circumvent the Massachusetts Blue Laws and play on a Sunday. Although used primarily for soccer, Mark’s also operated a semi-professional baseball team and the stadium’s design was decidedly baseball-friendly. This included an L-shaped stand which was placed behind one of the corner-flags. The stadium also incorporated a small dirt track for auto racing up until the early 1950s which somewhat reduced the size of the soccer pitch.

The 1925 National Challenge Cup final and the first Lewis Cup final were both held at the stadium. Although a crowd of only 1,000 turned up to see Shawsheen Indians defeat Canadian Club of Chicago 3-0 in the Challenge Cup on April 19, a capacity crowd of 15,000 saw Boston Soccer Club defeat Fall River F.C. 2-1 in the Lewis Cup. In subsequent seasons the stadium regularly hosted prestige friendlies between the 'Marksmen' and visiting teams such as Rangers, an Italian League XI and Kilmarnock.

In 1931, after Sam Mark relocated Fall River F.C. to New York and named them the New York Yankees, he made the stadium available to anybody willing to place a team there. A group of Fall River businessmen, led by an ex-Marksmen player Harold Brittan, bought Providence Gold Bugs and moved them to Mark's Stadium where they played as Fall River F.C. During their brief stay the new tenants beat both Argentine team Vélez Sársfield and Scottish Celtic in prestige friendlies. In the 1940s and 1950s Ponta Delgada S.C. also played some home games at the stadium.

In 1939 Mark's Stadium hosted midget car racing on a 1.5 mile track built around the pitch. The sport was suspended during World War II, returning from 1945 to 1947 and again during 1952–53.

In the 1950s, the stadium was torn down, and was replaced by a drive-in movie theater, as well as a large restaurant and banquet hall in the former parking area run by the Ponta Delgada Club. The theater was closed for a time in the 1970s, and by the early 1980s it was closed for good. The screen was torn down in the decades to follow, and the site of the stadium itself is now a large empty lot behind the former Ponta Delgada Restaurant, which is now partially closed itself.

== Notable games ==
April 19, 1925

(United States) Shawsheen Indians	3–0	(United States) Chicago Canadian Club
Eddie Smith; Alex Carrie; Peter Purden	(Report)

1925 National Challenge Cup
Attendance: 1,000

March 29, 1925

(United States) Fall River F.C.	1–2	(United States) Boston Soccer Club
	(Report)

Lewis Cup final
Attendance: 15,000

June 3, 1928

(United States) Fall River F.C.	0–0	(Scotland) Rangers F.C.
	(Report)

Friendly
Attendance: 15,000

August 26, 1928

(United States) Fall River F.C.	4–2	(Italy) Italian League XI
	(Report)

Friendly

June 15, 1930

(United States) Fall River F.C.	3–0	(Scotland) Kilmarnock
Archie Stark; Alex McNab; Bob McAuley	(Report)

Friendly
Attendance: 5,000

February 22, 1931

(United States) Fall River F.C.	5–2	(Argentina) Vélez Sársfield
	(Report)

Friendly

May 31, 1931

(United States) Fall River F.C.	1–0	(Scotland) Celtic
Billy Watson	(Report)

Friendly
Attendance: 5,000

July 7, 1946

(United States) Ponta Delgada S.C.	1–0	(United States) Chicago Vikings
Ed Souza or John Souza ?	(Report)	McDermott

National Challenge Cup final
Attendance: 6,000
