= 1923 National Amateur Cup =

Tournament details
- Country: United States
- Teams: 68

Final positions
- Champions: Not awarded

The 1923 National Amateur Cup was the USFA's first attempt to stage a national knockout competition strictly for amateur soccer teams. This edition however did not reach a conclusion and no overall winner was crowned. The tournament suffered numerous delays. Among the worst instances was an early round game between Swedish Americans of Chicago and Gary, Indiana scheduled for mid December. Poor field conditions due to bad weather prevented the completion of their matchup until the end of March. Consequently, no national final or semifinals were played. Ten years prior, the USFA's earlier incarnation, the AAFA, had conducted two tournaments on the amateur level. Both were successful in the sense that they were completed expeditiously however they were able to draw few if any teams from beyond the New York area. The 1923 amateur tournament drew 68 teams ranging from Chicago, Illinois to Rumford, Maine including even a team from San Francisco, California, the Olympic Club though their entry was rejected as a matter of logistics.

== New England ==
First Round
Ansonia
bye
Danersk
bye
Taftville AA	w/o
Stamford Soccer
Manchester Olympic
bye
Roxbury
bye
March 24 - Sullivan square
Charlestown	2
General Electric Thistle	1
November 30 - Westford
Abbot Worsted Co. Junior	3
South Boston Celtic	0
Boston St. George AA
Oxford Athletic

Second Round
March 17 - Hotchkiss Field
Ansonia	1
Danersk	0
March 24 - Taftville
Taftville	3
Manchester Olympic	2
April 7
Roxbury	7
Charlestown	0
March 31
Abbot Worsted Junior	2
St. George	0

Third Round
March 30
Ansonia	10
Taftville	0
April 14 - Westford
Roxbury	2
Abbott Worsted Junior	0

Quarterfinals
June 24 - Ansonia
Ansonia	1
Roxbury	2

== Eastern Pennsylvania ==
First Round
December 3 - Philadelphia
Wolfenden Shore & Co.	1
Fleisher Yarn	3
Fairhill
bye
December 10 - Philadelphia
36th Ward	5
Barney Ernst	2
December 2
Centennial Athletic	1
Puritan Young Men's League	0

Second Round
December 23 - Philadelphia
Fleisher Yarn	3
Fairhill	0
January 6 - Fleisher Athletic Field
36th Ward	3
Centennial	2

Third Round
February 18
Fleisher Yarn	2
36th Ward	0

== NY-NJ ==
First Round
December 17 - Flatbush Field
Tyrconnell Celtic
West Harlem Catholic Club
Dec 24 – Tacony Oval
Overseas Wanderers	3
Viking	2
Dec 10 – Clarks Field
American AA	2
Bayonne Rovers	0
Dec 10 – Eastside Park
Paterson Caledonian Reserves	0
Pearsall Athletic	1
February 25 - Dekalb Oval
Brooklyn St. George
Glen Cove
Apr 8 – Mohawk Oval
Hawthorne United	0
Steinway Civic	2

Second Round
May 6 - Hawthorne Field
Tyrconnell Celtic	2
Overseas Wanderers	0
Mar 18 - Kellogg Oval
American AA	3
Pearsall Field Club	1
May 6 - Hawthorne Field
Brooklyn St. George	2
Steinway Civic	0

Third Round
May 27
Tyrconnell Celtic	0
American AA	1
May 20
Brooklyn St. George	3
British Great War Veterans	0

Quarterfinals
June 4 - Clifton
American AA	3
Brooklyn St. George	1

== Ohio-West PA ==
First Round
November 25
Clan MacGregor	0
Jeannette	1
East Liberty Ulster
bye
December 3 - Atlasburg
Carnegie Coal Co.	3
East Pittsburg International	0
December 2 - Lawrence Park
Pittsburgh Rovers	2
Irwin	1
December 10/17
Goodyear	1-W
Kenmoore	1-L
Nov 27/Dec 3
British Great War Vets	1-1
Clan MacKenzie	1-2
Cleveland Magyars	w/o
White Motor
MacNaughton Rangers
Kodak Park

Second Round
December 23
Jeannette	5
Ulster	0
December 23
Atlasburg
Pittsburgh Rovers
January 7 - Seiberling Field
Goodyear
Clan MacKenzie
White Auto	w/o
MacNaughton Rangers

Third Round
January 7
Jeannette	5
Atlasburg	1
January 21 - Akron
Goodyear	0
White Auto	2

Quarterfinals
February 24 - Jeannette
Jeannette	1
White Auto	0

== Illinois-Michigan ==
First Round
December 17 - Packard Park
Fisher Body Soccer	0
Detroit FC	6
Liberty
bye
December 10 - Solvay Park
Highland Park	0
Ulster AA	1
Royal Oak
bye
March 25 - Riverview Park
Swedish American	8
Gary	0
Harvey F.C.
bye
No
entries
No
entries

Second Round
January 14 - Packard Park
Detroit FC	2
Liberty	1
January 14 - Packard Park
Ulster	1
Royal Oak	3
Swedish American
Harvey

Third Round
January 28 - Detroit
Detroit FC	1
Royal Oak	0
Swedish American
Idle

Quarterfinals
June 24 - Detroit
Detroit FC	2
Swedish American	3

Round of 64

November 1922	Boston St. George	-	Oxford Athletic

November 25, 1922; 3:30PM	Clan MacGregor	0–1	Jeannette	Greensburg, PA
	1H' Adams		65' Frank Mostrolo	Stadium: Electric Park; Referee: Fairfield
Note: Clan MacGregor walked off at 80' in dispute of penalty with score 1–1. Game awarded to Jeannette 1–0.

November 30, 1922	Abbot Worsted Junior	3-0	South Boston Celtic	Westford, MA
	Cavanaugh (2); Lund

December 2, 1922	Pittsburgh Rovers	2–1	Irwin	Pittsburgh, PA
	1H' Bedford; 2H' Craddock		1H' Malpezzi	Stadium: Lawrence Park; Referee: Sherrard

December 2, 1922	Centennial Athletic	1–0	Puritan Young Men's League	Philadelphia, PA
	Brigham (pk)			Stadium: Lawrence Park; Referee: E. Jenkins

December 3, 1922	Atlasburg	3–0	East Pittsburgh International	Atlasburg, PA
	46' Donelli; Longstreth (2)			Stadium: Lawrence Park; Referee: Brown

December 3, 1922	Wolfenden Shore & Co.	1–3	Fleisher Yarn	Cardington, PA
	5' Rudolph (pk)		60', 80', 2H' Purvis	Referee: Arthur Watson

December 10, 1922	Cleveland Magyars	w/o	White Motor
Note: Cleveland Magyars forfeited.

December 10, 1922	36th Ward	5–2	Barney Ernst	Philadelphia, PA

December 10, 1922; 1:45PM	Ulster	1-0	Highland Park	Detroit, MI
	OT' Elliott			Stadium: Solvay Park; Referee: Ferguson

December 10, 1922; 3:15PM	Detroit FC	0-1	Fisher Body	Detroit, MI
			25' V. Feldborg	Stadium: Solvay Park; Referee: C. Leech
Note: Game called on account of darkness before full time.

December 10, 1922	Taftville	w/o	Stamford	Taftville, CT
Note: Stamford forfeited.

December 17, 1922; 2:30PM Replay	Detroit FC	6-0	Fisher Body	Detroit, MI
	8', 1H', 2H' W. Campbell; Bryan; Clark (2)			Stadium: Packard Park; Referee: C. Leech

January 7, 1923; 2:30PM	Goodyear	W-L	Clan MacKenzie	Akron, OH
				Stadium: Seiberling Field

March 24, 1923	Charlestown	2–1	Lynn Thistle	Bsoton, MA
	30' Neilson; 33' Irvine		Nichols	Stadium: Sullivan Square; Referee: R. Ritchie

May 6, 1923; 1:00PM	Brooklyn St. George	2-0	Steinway	Brooklyn, NY
				Stadium: Hawthorne Field

May 1923	British Great War Veterans	-

May 6, 1923	Tyrconnell Celts	2-0	Overseas Wanderers	Brooklyn, NY
				Stadium: Hawthorne Field

March 18, 1923	American AA	3-1	Pearsall Field Club	Harrison, NJ
	Strong; Florie; Finnerty		Pearsall

Round of 32

December 3, 1922	MacNaughton Rangers	w/o	Kodak Park	Rochester, NY
Note: Kodak was required to forfeit on account of having registered professional players on their team.

December 23, 1922	Jeannette	5-0	Ulster	Jeannette, PA
	Henry Monstrolo; Victor Monstrolo; Frank Monstrolo; Bobby Robertson; Frank Monstrolo; Mike Monstrolo			Referee: Birks

December 23, 1922	Pittsburgh Rovers	w/o	Atlasburg	Pittsburgh, PA
				Stadium: Seiberling Field; Referee: Brannigan
Note: Rovers forfeited due to their field being unsuitable for play and did not have enough players to travel to Atlasburg.

December 23, 1922	Fleisher Yarn	3-0	Fairhill	Philadelphia, PA
	40', 2H' McLaughlin; 75' Straden			Referee: James Walders

January 6, 1923	36th Ward	3-2	Centennial	Philadelphia, PA
	3' Devlin; Lennon; 89' McKenna		Haigh; 35' Brigham	Stadium: Fleisher Athletic Field; Referee: James Walders

January 14, 1923; 1:45PM	Detroit FC	3-1	Liberty	Detroit, MI
	12', 1H' Clark; 55' W. Campbell		25' E. Green	Stadium: Packard Park; Referee: H. Wilesmith

January 14, 1923; 3:30PM	Ulster	1-2	Royal Oak	Detroit, MI
	5' Elliot		E. Berry (2)	Stadium: Packard Park; Referee: W. Millar

January 21, 1923	Goodyear	0-2	White Auto	Akron, OH
			J. Smith (2)	Stadium: Seiberling Field; Referee: J.R. Lawrence

March 18, 1923; 3:00PM	Ansonia	1-0	Danersk	Ansonia, CT
	Duncan			Stadium: Hotchkiss Field; Referee: J. Miller

March 24, 1923	Taftville	3-2	Manchester Olympic	Taftville, CT
	42' Bob Young; Fred Monstrolo; Frank Monstrolo; Bob Young; Bob Young		1H' Longstretch	Referee: Spence

March 25, 1923	Swedish American	8-0	Gary	Chicago, IL
	1H' Peterson; 1H' Brun; 1H' Magnuson; 2H' (5)			Stadium: Riverview Park

March 31, 1923	Boston St. George	0-2	Abbot Worsted Junior	Boston, MA
	Yeuelle (og)		75' Kavanaugh	Stadium: Sullivan Square; Referee: Thomas B. White

April 7, 1923; 3:00PM	Roxbury	7-0	Charlestown	Boston, MA
	Doherty; Salsbury (3); W. McGonigle (2); Pat McDermott			Stadium: JJ Connelly playground Referee: W. Andrews

May 20, 1923	Brooklyn St. George	3-0	British Great War Veterans	Brooklyn, NY
	10' Hindle (pk); 67' Davidson; 85' Ough			Stadium: Hawthorne Field

May 27, 1923	Tyrconnell Celtic	0-1	American AA	Brooklyn, NY

Round of 16

January 7, 1923	Jeannette	5-1	Atlasburg	Jeannette, PA
	42' Bob Young; Fred Monstrolo; Frank Monstrolo; Bob Young; Bob Young		1H' Longstretch	Referee: Spence

January 28, 1923	White Motor	w/o	MacNaughton Rangers	Cleveland, OH
				Stadium: Luna Park
Note: MacNaughton failed to appear as a matter of disputed fees. Game awarded to White Motor.

January 28, 1923	Detroit FC	1-0	Royal Oak	Detroit, MI
	75' Clark			Stadium: Packard Park; Referee: J. Wilson

February 18, 1923	Fleisher Yarn	2-0	36th Ward	Ansonia, CT
	Duncan		Daugherty (2)	Stadium: Hotchkiss Field

March 30, 1923	Ansonia	10-0	Taftville	Ansonia, CT
	Howard (3); Duncan (2); Larson (2); Daston; Wolley; Mace

April 1, 1923	Harvey	1-3	Swedish American	Harvey, IL
	2H'		25' Brun; Allan Carlson; Carl Johnson

April 14, 1923; 3:00PM	Roxbury	2-0	Abbot Worsted Junior	Forge Village, MA
	30' R. Smith; 46' McDermott			Stadium: Abbot Field; Referee: Abe Crowther

June 3, 1923; 1:00PM	American AA	3-1	Sons St. George	Clifton, NJ
	Tommie Strong; Cunningham; Florie		Davidson	Stadium: Olympic Park; Referee: James Hayes

Quarterfinals

February 24, 1923	Jeanette (W. Pa.)	1-0	White Auto (Cle.)	Jeanette, PA
	Mike Monstrollo 2H (Victor Monstrollo)			Referee: G.M. Brannigan

June 17, 1923; 3:00PM	American AA (Newark)	2-4	Fleischer Yarn (Phi,)	Paterson, NJ
	Phalon 2H 90’		Purvis 1’ 55’, Stradin 62’, Galloway 2H (PK)	Stadium: Olympic Park; Referee: Charles Ward

June 24, 1923	Ansonia (CT)	1-2	Roxbury (MA)	Ansonia, CT
	Duncan		Daugherty (2)	Stadium: Hotchkiss Field

June 24, 1923	Detroit FC	1-3	Swedish American FC (Chi.)	Detroit, MI
	Clark 10'		G. Rundkvist 55’, Brun 2H, Magnuson 2H	Stadium: Solvay Park; Referee: J.B. Stark

Semifinals
The Eastern and Western Finals were not played. The teams received medals for winning their districts.

Jeannette	-	Swedish American

Fleisher Yarn	-	Roxbury

== See also ==
- 1922-23 National Challenge Cup
- 1923 American Cup
