= 1924–25 National Challenge Cup =

- Dewar Challenge Cup

Tournament details
- Country: United States
- Dates: 17 January – 19 April 1925

Final positions
- Champions: Shawsheen Indians (1st title)
- Runners-up: Canadian Club
- Semifinalists: Cleveland Thistles; Abbot Worsted

The 1924–25 National Challenge Cup was the annual open cup held by the United States Football Association now known as the Lamar Hunt U.S. Open Cup.

== History ==
Teams from the American Soccer League and St. Louis Soccer League had won the previous several Challenge Cups, but dissatisfaction with the financial arrangements led the two leagues to boycott this year's cup. While the United States Football Association gained its operating income from annual dues by member teams, most of its income came from its annual challenge cup. On the other hand, the owners of the top professional teams saw the challenge cup as a money losing competition as they were forced to play obscure amateur teams which tended to have smaller crowds and therefore gate receipts. After USFA took its cut, the amount distributed to the teams frequently did not cover the travel expenses. Therefore, the SLSL proposed, and the ASL agreed to, the creation of an American Professional Soccer Championship. That game series took place in April 1925 at University Field in St. Louis, Missouri. Over the three games, the Boston Soccer Club defeated the Ben Millers in front of an average crowd of over 10,000 spectators per game. In contrast, the National Challenge Cup final between the Shawsheen Indians and Chicago Canadian Club, played at the usually high drawing Mark's Stadium, saw only 2,500 spectators, down from the 18,000 who watched the 1924 final. At a May 1925 meeting, USFA agreed to reduce their percentage of the gate receipts from 33.3% to 15%. This defused the ASL and SLSL hostility to the challenge cup leading to their re-entering the competition for 1926.

== Eastern Division ==
First round
Shawsheen Indians | w/o
Arlington Mills
February 22 - Rochester
Moose F.C. | 2
Whittal F.C. | 5
February 14 - Philadelphia
Lighthouse Blue Sox | 2
Bayonne F.C. | 3
February 22 - Bridgeport
Clan Campbell | 1
Lexington F.C. | 3
February 14 - Quincy
Fore River F.C. | 0
Abbot Worsted | 2
Waypoyset F.C. | w/o
Boston United
February 22 - Ansonia
Ansonia F.C. | 4
Manchester | 1
February 14 - Pawtucket
Sayles Finishing Plant | 3
Lorraine Manufacturing Co | 2

Second round
February 28 - Andover
Shawsheen Indians | 4
Whittal F.C. | 1
March 1 - Jersey City
Bayonne F.C. | 1
Lexington F.C. | 0
Abbot Worsted | w/o
Waypoyset F.C.
March 1,14
Ansonia F.C. | 0-2
Sayles Finishing Plant | 3-9

Semi-finals
March 21 - Boston
Shawsheen Indians | 2
Bayonne F.C. | 0
March 21 - New Bedford
Abbot Worsted | 3
Sayles Finishing Plant | 2

Final
April 4 - Andover
Shawsheen Indians | 2
Abbot Worsted | 1

== Western Division ==
First round
January 25 - Chicago
Chicago Canadian Club | 3
Gillespie S.C. | 0
February 8 - Chicago
Pullman F.C. | 4
Sparta ABA | 1
February 8 - Chicago
Bricklayers and Masons | 0
Olympia F.C. | 2
January 18 - Chicago
Harvey F.C. | 3
North Shore F.C. | 0
January 25 - Cleveland
Cleveland Thistles | 5
British War Veterans | 0
January 18 - Akron
Goodyear F.C. | 5
Mahoning Valley | 1
January 17 - Vestaburg
Vestaburg SC | 6
Jeannette F.C. | 2
February 8 - Toledo
Toledo S.C. | 2
Gar Wood SC | 1

Second round
February 15 - Chicago
Canadian Club | 2
Pullman F.C. | 1
February 15 - Chicago
Olympia F.C. | 0
Harvey F.C. | 2
February 8 - Cleveland
Cleveland Thistles | 2
Goodyear F.C. | 0
February 15 - Charleroi
Vestaburg SC | 2
Toledo S.C. | 1

Semi-finals
Mar 1,8,15 - Chicago
Canadian Club | 3^{a}
Harvey F.C. | 2
March 1 - Cleveland
Cleveland Thistles | 3
Vestaburg SC | 2

Final
March 22 - Chicago
Canadian Club | 2
Cleveland Thistles | 1

a) aggregate after 3 games

== Final ==
April 19, 1925

| Shawsheen Indians (MA) | 3–0 | Chicago Canadian Club (IL) |
|---|---|---|
| Smith 20'; Purden 35' (pen.); Carrie 60' | Report |

Mark's Stadium, North Tiverton, Rhode Island
Attendance: 2,500
Referee: William Norse (USA)
