= 1920–21 National Challenge Cup =

- Dewar Challenge Cup

Tournament details
- Country: United States
- Dates: 16 October 1920- 19 April 1921

Final positions
- Champions: Robins Dry Dock (1st title)
- Runners-up: Scullin Steel
- Semifinalists: Caledonia F.C.; Tebo Yacht Basin F.C.

The 1920–21 National Challenge Cup was the annual open cup held by the United States Football Association now known as the Lamar Hunt U.S. Open Cup.

== History ==
On September 25, 1920, the National Challenge Cup held a drawing for the first round of the 1921 National Challenge Cup. The drawing paired eighty-five entrants, down from 99 the previous year being due to the fact the entrance fee had been raised from $5 to $10. The cup a single elimination format consisting of six rounds and a single game final. The entrants were dividing into an eastern and a western division which led to a final pitting St. Louis Scullin Steel F.C. from the west and Brooklyn Robins Dry Dock from the east.

== First round ==
=== Eastern Division ===
==== Northern Massachusetts District ====
Byes: Maple Leaf F.C.; Gray & Davis F.C.

16 October 1920	Lynn Gas & Electric F.C.	7-1	Trimo F.C.

16 October 1920	Fore River F.C.	1-2	General Electric F.C.

30 October 1920 Replay due to General Electric rules violations	Fore River F.C.	5-0	General Electric F.C.

16 October 1920	Hendee Indians F.C.	4-1	Smith & Dove F.C.

16 October 1920	Abbot Worsted F.C.	9-0	Chicopee Rovers

16 October 1920	Arlington Mills F.C.	2-1	Boston City F.C.

16 October 1920	Farr Alpaca F.C.	4-2	United Shoe F.C.	Holyoke, Massachusetts

==== Southern New England District ====
Byes: Young Thornton F.C.; Potter & Johnson F.C.; Colonial F.C.; Greystone F.C.; Fairlawn Rovers

16 October 1920	J. & P. Coats F.C. (SNESL)	1-1	Fall River Rovers (SNESL)

16 October 1920	Ashton & Berkeley F.C.	3-2	Clan Cameron F.C.

16 October 1920	St. Michael's F.C.	1-1	Saylesville F.C.

30 October 1920 Replay	St. Michael's F.C.	1-1	Saylesville F.C.

7 November 1920 Replay	St. Michael's F.C.	3-1	Saylesville F.C.

30 October 1920 Replay	J. & P. Coats F.C. (SNESL)	1-2	Fall River Rovers (SNESL)

==== Connecticut District ====
Byes: Stamford F.C.; Ansonia F.C.; Columbia Gramophone Co.

17 October 1920	Hartford S.K.F.	1-0	New Departure F.C.

==== Southern New York District ====
Byes: Clan MacDuff F.C.; Brooklyn F.C.; Robins Dry Dock F.C.

17 October 1920	New York F.C. (NAFBL)	0-1	Tebo Yacht Basin F.C.

==== New Jersey District ====
Byes: Cedar Cliff F.C.

17 October 1920	Bunker Hill F.C. (NAFBL)	1-4	Paterson F.C. (NAFBL)

17 October 1920	Babcock & Wilcox F.C. (NAFBL)	2-4	Sprague F.C.

17 October 1920	Federal F.C.	8-2	Athenia Steel F.C.

17 October 1920	Erie A.A. Juniors	0-5	Erie A.A.F.C. (NAFBL)

==== Eastern Pennsylvania District ====
16 October 1920	J. & J. Dobson	4-3	Wolfenden-Shore	Philadelphia

16 October 1920	North End F.C.	0-6	Disston A.A. (NAFBL)

16 October 1920	Hibernian F.C. (AAFA)	1-6	Bethlehem Steel F.C. (NAFBL)	Philadelphia
				Stadium: Cahill Field; Attendance: 1500; Referee: John Walders

=== Western Division ===
==== Michigan District ====
Byes: I.F.L. F.C.; One and All F.C.; Walkerville F.C.; Magyar A.A.F.C.; Caledonia F.C.; Roses F.C.; Ulster F.C.

17 October 1920	Solvay F.C.	1-5	Pontiac City F.C.

==== Ohio District ====
Byes: Cleveland Greyhounds F.C.; White Motor Co. F.C.; Goodyear F.C.

16 October 1920	Firestone F.C.	0-4	Goodrich F.C.

==== Northwestern New York District ====
Byes: Oneida Community Co. F.C.; McNaughton Rangers F.C.; Rochester City Moose F.C.; Rochester Celtic F.C.; Camera Works F.C.; Kodak Park F.C.

==== Western Pennsylvania District ====
Bye: Madison F.C.

17 October 1920	Dunlevy F.C.	2-0	H.A. Geib Trainworks F.C.

==== Missouri District ====
Byes: Ben Miller F.C.; St. Louis Screw F.C.; Scullin Steel F.C.; Innisfail F.C.

==== Wisconsin District ====
Bye: Simco F.C.

==== Illinois District ====
Byes: Thistles F.C.; Bricklayers F.C.; Harvey F.C.; Swedish American A.A.; Pullman F.C.; Rangers A.C.; Norwegian American A.A.

== Bracket ==
Home teams listed on top of bracket

Third round Nov 25-Dec 12
NY	Robins Dry Dock	3
CT	Columbia Graphophone	0
NJ	Erie A.A.	3
NJ	Kearny Federal Ship	1
MA	Fore River	3
MA	Gray & Davis	0
MA	Fall River Rovers	4
MA	St. Michael's F.C.	0
RI	Fairlawn Rovers	1
RI	Potter & Johnson	0
MA	Lynn GE	3
MA	Boston City	1
NY	Tebo Yacht Basin F.C.	8
CT	Ansonia F.C.	2
PA	Dobson F.C.	2
NJ	Paterson	1
MI	Pontiac City	2
MI	Caledonia F.C.	3
MI	Roses F.C.	3
Ulster F.C.	0
OH	Goodrich F.C.	2
OH	Goodyear F.C.	1
NY	Kodak Park F.C.	4
NY	McNaughton Rangers	0
MO	Scullin Steel	4
MO	Innisfails	3
PA	Madison S.C.	3
NY	Moose A.F.C.	1
IL	Harvey F.C.	2
Thistles F.C.	1
IL	Bricklayers and Masons	2
WI	Simco F.C.	0

Fourth round Dec 12-26
NY	Robins Dry Dock	1-5*
NJ	Erie A.A.	1-3
MA	Fore River	3
MA	Fall River Rovers	1
RI	Fairlawn Rovers	3
MA	Lynn GE	1
NY	Tebo Yacht Basin F.C.	2
PA	Dobson F.C.	1
MI	Caledonia F.C.	2
MI	Roses F.C.	1
OH	Goodrich F.C.	w/o
NY	Kodak Park F.C.
MO	Scullin Steel	3
PA	Madison S.C.	0
IL	Harvey F.C.	1-0
IL	Bricklayers and Masons	1-5

Quarterfinals; Dec 23-Mar 6
NY	Robins Dry Dock	3
MA	Fore River	0
RI	Fairlawn Rovers	1
NY	Tebo Yacht Basin F.C.	3
MI	Caledonia F.C.	2
OH	Goodrich F.C.	1
MO	Scullin Steel	1-2-2*
IL	Bricklayers and Masons	1-1-0

Semifinals; March 13,27
MA	Robins Dry Dock	3
NY	Tebo Yacht Basin F.C.	0
MO	Scullin Steel	2
MI	Caledonia F.C.	1

Final; April 19
NY	Robins Dry Dock	4
MO	Scullin Steel	2

(*): replay after tied match
w/o: walkover/forfeit victory awarded

== Final ==
April 19, 1921

Robins Dry Dock (NY)	4–2	Scullin Steel (MO)
McGuire 16'; Hosie 29' (Ratican); Sweeney 64'; McKelvey (Sweeney)	Report	Bechtold 15' (Nolan), 19'

Fall River, Massachusetts
Attendance: 8,000
Referee: James E. Schofield, Bristol, Connecticut (USA)

== See also ==
- 1920–21 American Cup

== Sources ==
- USOpenCup.com
