= 1921–22 National Challenge Cup =

- Dewar Challenge Cup

Tournament details
- Country: United States
- Teams: 118

Final positions
- Champions: St. Louis Scullin Steel F.C.
- Runners-up: Todd Shipyards F.C.

The 1920–21 National Challenge Cup was the 9th edition of the oldest ongoing competition in American soccer.

The competition began with 118 teams separated into an eastern and western division, eventually narrowing to St. Louis Scullin Steel F.C. of the St. Louis Soccer League (SLSL) and Todd Shipyards of the American Soccer League. The title game was originally scheduled to take place at Federal Field in St. Louis, Missouri, the SLSL's main stadium. However, in May 1922, the USFA directed a change in venue after the fees to be charged by the field became exorbitant. After an extensive search, USFA settled on High School Field in St. Louis. On March 19, 1922, Scullin Steel defeated Todd Shipyards to become the second St. Louis team to win the trophy.

== Bracket ==
Home teams listed on top of bracket

Third Round; Nov 24-Dec 18
MI	Caledonia F.C.	1
IL	Gillespie	1
MI	Roses F.C.	1-1
MI	Industrial F.C.	1-2
PA	Arden F.C.	3
PA	Dunlevy	0
OH	White Automobile	0-1
OH	Magyar-American	0-0
MO	Scullin Steel	2
IL	Johnston City	0
MO	Ben Millers	3
MO	Paulians	1
IL	Pullman F.C.	2
IL	Rangers F.C.	0
WI	Simco F.C.	4
IL	Bricklayers and Masons	2
NY	Todd Shipyard	5
NY	New York Field Club	3
PA	Philadelphia Field Club	5
PA	Fleisher Yarn	0
NY	Viking F.C.	4
NY	Moose F.C.	3
NJ	Harrison S.C.	5
NJ	Antler F.C.	0
MA	Fall River United	1
RI	J&P Coats	2
MA	Holyoke Falcos	5
CT	St. George F.C.	2
MA	Gray & Davis	0
MA	Abbot Worsted	2
RI	Fairlawn Rovers	1
RI	Sayles Finishing Plant	0

Fourth Round; Dec 24-Jan 7
MI	Caledonia F.C.	1
MI	Industrial	0
PA	Arden F.C.	2
OH	White Automobile	0
MO	Scullin Steel	3
MO	Ben Millers	0
IL	Pullman F.C.	3
WI	Simco F.C.	2
PA	Philadelphia Field Club	1
NY	Todd Shipyard	4
NY	Viking F.C.	2
NJ	Harrison S.C.	6
RI	J&P Coats	3
MA	Holyoke Falcos	4
MA	Abbot Worsted	1-2
RI	Fairlawn Rovers	1-0

Quarterfinals; Jan 1-Feb 12
MI	Caledonia F.C.	3
PA	Arden F.C.	2
MO	Scullin Steel	3
IL	Pullman F.C.	0
NJ	Harrison S.C.	0
NY	Todd Shipyard	1
MA	Abbot Worsted	3
MA	Holyoke Falcos	1

Semifinals; February 25
MO	Scullin Steel	4
MI	Caledonia F.C.	0
NY	Todd Shipyard	2
MA	Abbot Worsted	1

Final; March 19
MO	Scullin Steel	3
NY	Todd Shipyard	2

w/o: walkover/forfeit victory awarded

== Final ==
March 19, 1922

Scullin Steel (MO)	3–2	Todd Shipyards (NY)
Brady 37'; Schwartz 71' (???)	Report	McGuire (???)

High School Field, St. Louis, Missouri
Attendance: 8,568
Referee: George Young (USA)

== See also ==
- 1922 American Cup

== Sources ==
- thecup.us
