= Alex Carrie =

Scottish footballer

Personal information
- Place of birth: Arbroath, Scotland
- Position: Center forward

Senior career*
| Years | Team | Apps | (Gls) |
- Ardenlea
| 1921–1922 | Arbroath | 19 | (2) |
| 1924–1926 | Shawsheen Indians | | |
| 1926 | New Bedford Whalers | 1 | (0) |
- * Club domestic league appearances and goals

Alex Carrie was a Scottish soccer center forward who played professionally in both Scotland and the USA during the early twentieth century. He was born in Arbroath, Scotland.

Carrie began his career with Ardenlea before moving the Arbroath F.C. In 1924, George Wallace recruited several Scottish League players to play for his team, the Shawsheen Indians of the New England National League. At the time, Wallace had convinced William Madison Wood, owner of the American Woolen Company, to sponsor the team. With the financial backing of Wood, Wallace entered the Indians in the 1925 National Challenge Cup, the first time the team had entered that competition. It took the title with a 3–0 victory over Chicago Canadian Club with Carrie scoring a goal in the final. The next season, Wallace moved the Indians into the first division American Soccer League where it performed well, until the death of Mr. Wood. The death of Mr. Wood brought the end of the American Woolen Company's support of the Indians and the team was forced to withdraw from the ASL at the end of March 1926. Carrie moved to the New Bedford Whalers for the remainder of the 1925–1926 season but left the league at the end of the season. Carrie played seventeen games with Shawsheen, scoring seven goals, during the 1925–1926 season.

== Personal life ==
Alex Carrie had a wife, Elizabeth, and a son, Ronald (born 1929).
