= Mike Bookie =

American soccer player

Personal information
- Full name: Michael Bookie
- Date of birth: September 12, 1904
- Place of birth: Pittsburgh, Pennsylvania, U.S.
- Date of death: October 12, 1944 (aged 40)
- Place of death: Camp Eglin, Florida, U.S.
- Position: Midfielder

Senior career*
Years	Team	Apps	(Gls)
- Jeannette
1924–1925	Boston Soccer Club	5	(1)
1925	Vestaburg		
1925–1926	New Bedford Whalers	4	(0)
1927	American Hungarian		
1929–1931	Cleveland Slavia		
- Curry Silver Tops

International career
1930	United States	1	(0)
Medal record
Men's soccer
Representing United States
FIFA World Cup
Third place	1930 Uruguay
- * Club domestic league appearances and goals

Michael Bookie (September 12, 1904 – October 12, 1944) was an American soccer midfielder. He was a member of the United States national soccer team at the 1930 FIFA World Cup and is a member of the National Soccer Hall of Fame.

== Professional career ==
Bookie began his athletic career as a minor league baseball player playing shortstop in Pittsburgh. He then joined several amateur soccer clubs, including Jeannette F.C. in western Pennsylvania before signing with the Boston Soccer Club of the American Soccer League in 1924. In January 1925, he moved to Vestaburg SC where he finished out the season. In the fall of 1925, returned to the ASL, this time with the New Bedford Whalers. He saw time in only four games with the Whalers. From February through April 1927, he played for American Hungarian. In December 1929, he moved to Cleveland Slavia of the Mid-West Professional League. Bookie was with Slavia when selected to the U.S. 1930 World Cup team. In March 1931, he left Cleveland Slavia. He may have played for other Cleveland teams before finishing his career with Pittsburgh Curry Silver Tops.

== National team ==
While selected to the U.S. roster for the 1930 FIFA World Cup, Bookie never entered a game in the cup. After Argentina eliminated the U.S. in the semifinals, the U.S. went on a tour of Uruguay and Brazil. In the only official international game of the tour, Bookie earned his only national team cap in a 4–3 loss to Brazil.

He enlisted in the Army in 1944 and died after being accidentally killed by machine gunfire during a training simulation.

He was inducted into the National Soccer Hall of Fame in 1986.
