= Forge Village Historic District =

Historic district in Massachusetts, United States

- U.S. National Register of Historic Places
- U.S. Historic district
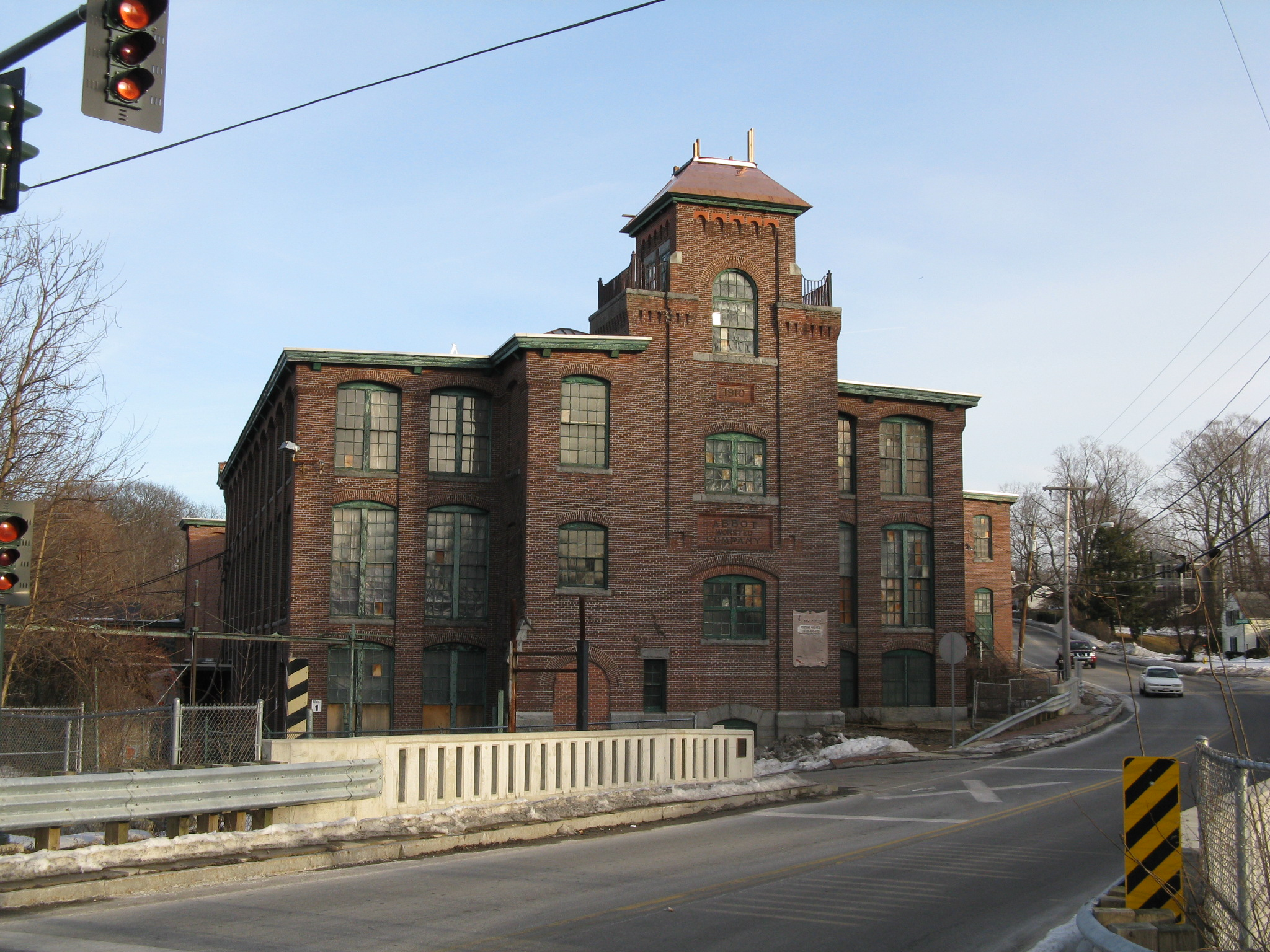
- Abbott Worsted Company 1910

- Location within Massachusetts Location within the United States
- Location: Westford, Massachusetts
- Coordinates: 42°34′51″N 71°28′58″W
- Area: 250 acres (100 ha)
- Architect: Harrington, P. Henry; et al.
- Architectural style: Colonial, Federal
- NRHP reference No.: 02000430
- Added to NRHP: May 2, 2002

The Forge Village Historic District of Westford, Massachusetts, United States encompasses one of the town's historic 19th century mill villages. The focal point of the district is the mill complex of the Abbot Worsted Company, around which the village expanded after its founding in 1854. Prior to its founding the area was the site of a number of blacksmithies and iron forging operations, and was the site of a fulling mill in the 18th century. The center of the district is at the junction of East and West Prescott Streets with Pleasant Street, radiating away to ballfields on West Prescott, Abbot Street at Pleasant, and just beyond Orchard Street on East Prescott. Worker housing occupies a number of adjacent streets in the area.

The district was listed on the National Register of Historic Places in 2002.

== See also ==
- Brookside Historic District
- Graniteville Historic District
- National Register of Historic Places listings in Middlesex County, Massachusetts
