= Alex Kemp =

Alex Kemp can refer to:

- Alex Kemp (cricketer) (born 1988), Australian cricketer
- Alex Kemp (footballer), Scottish footballer
- Alex Kemp (American football official)
