= Graniteville Historic District (Westford, Massachusetts) =

Historic district in Massachusetts, United States

- U.S. National Register of Historic Places
- U.S. Historic district
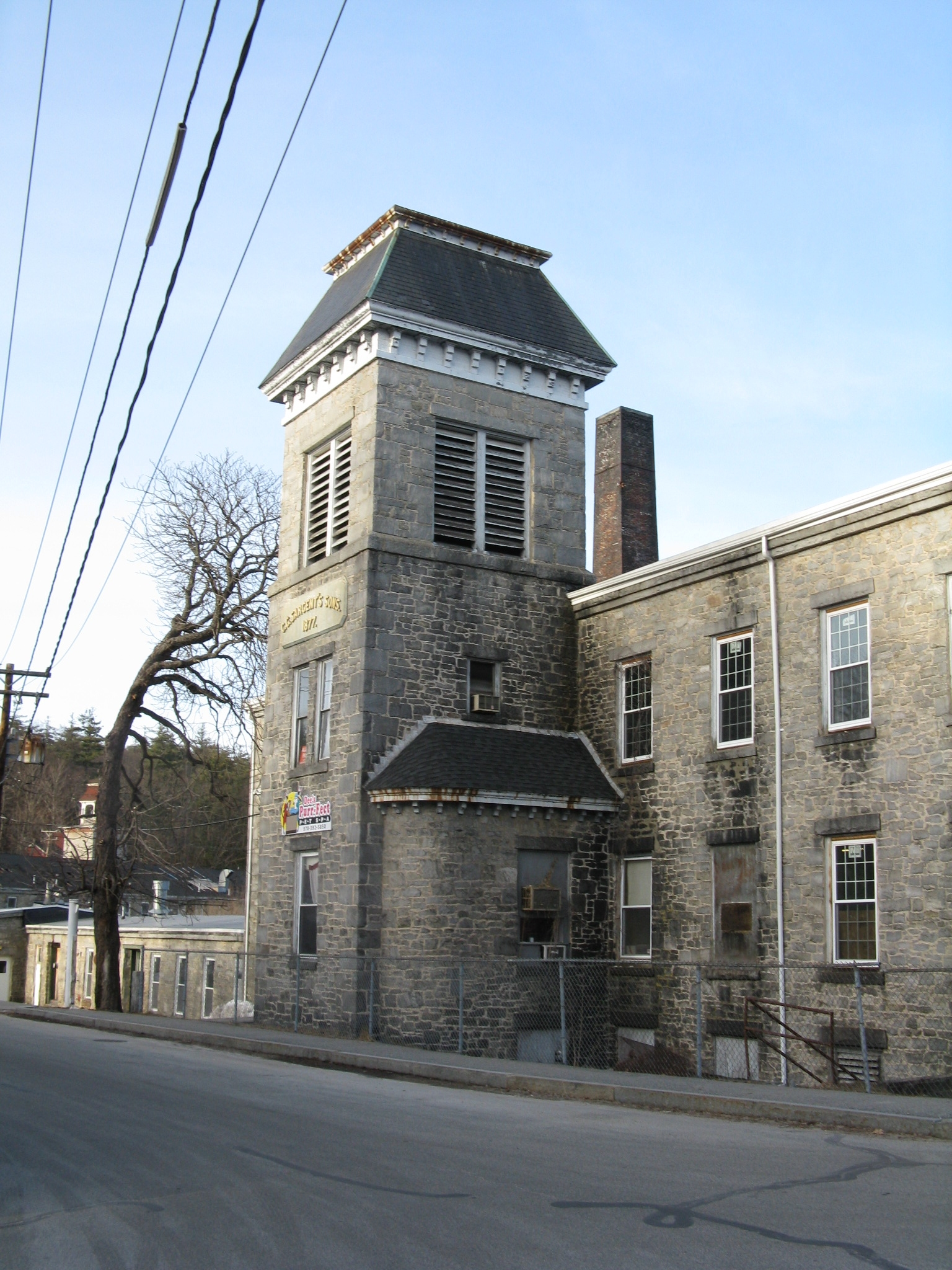
- C.G. Sargent's Sons 1877

- Location within Massachusetts Location within the United States
- Location: Westford, Massachusetts
- Coordinates: 42°35′42″N 71°28′12″W
- Area: 150 acres (61 ha)
- Architect: Woodcock, S.S.; et al.
- Architectural style: Federal, Gothic
- NRHP reference No.: 01001467
- Added to NRHP: January 17, 2002

The Graniteville Historic District of Westford, Massachusetts, United States, encompasses one of the town's historic 19th century industrial villages. The area was, until the arrival of the railroad in 1847, primarily known for its granite quarries. The railroad's arrival prompted the construction of an industrial mill by Charles G. Sargent, and the area developed rapidly thereafter. A significant amount of housing stock, as well as civic institutional buildings, were built during the second half of the 19th century. The district is bounded on the east by River Street and on the south by Bridge Street and North Main Street. The western edge of the district runs just before North Main Street's junction with West Street, northward and then eastward to encompass a number of quarry sites, before meeting North Main Street at River Street.

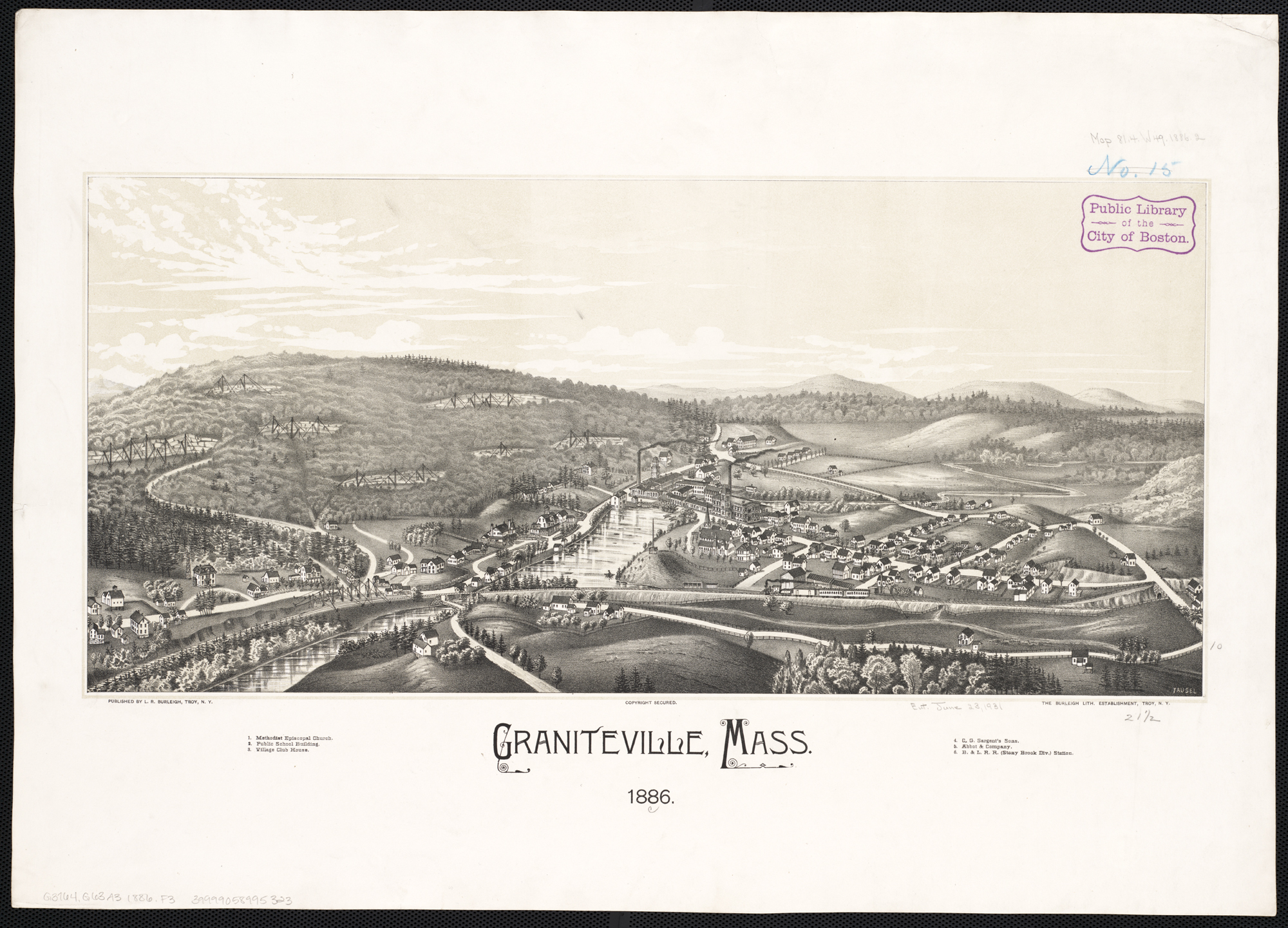
Lithograph of Graniteville from 1886 by L.R. Burleigh with list of landmarks

The district was listed on the National Register of Historic Places in 2002.

== See also ==
- Forge Village Historic District
- Brookside Historic District
- National Register of Historic Places listings in Middlesex County, Massachusetts
