= Edward Donaghy (referee) =

American soccer player and referee

Personal information
- Place of birth: Cambuslang, Scotland
- Place of death: USA
- Position: Inside left

Senior career*
Years	Team	Apps	(Gls)
- Tacony
- Philadelphia Hibernian
1913–1915	Bethlehem		
- Braddock
1915–????	Homestead		
- Castle Shannon
- * Club domestic league appearances and goals

Edward J. Donaghy was an American soccer player and referee active in the 1920s and 1930s. Donaghy is a member of the National Soccer Hall of Fame, and managed a number of important matches, such as the finals of the National Challenge Cup in 1930 and 1934, as well as three games in the 1934 FIFA World Cup qualification.

Donaghy had begun his career as a player in his native Scotland, before moving to America in 1911. Donaghy played soccer as in inside left between 1911 and 1919 for Tacony, Philadelphia Hibernian, Bethlehem, Braddock, Homestead and Castle Shannon, before beginning his refereeing career in 1920. He played for Bethlehem Steel from 1913 to early 1915. He scored the winning goal for Bethlehem in the replay over Tacony in the 1914 American Cup. In March 1915, Bethlehem Steel released him and he signed with Homestead.
