= Johnny Jaap =

Scottish-American soccer player

Personal information
- Date of birth: August 12, 1895
- Place of birth: Bellshill, Scotland
- Date of death: May 1, 1974 (aged 78)
- Place of death: Pittsburgh, Pennsylvania, USA
- Position: Inside right

Senior career*
| Years | Team | Apps | (Gls) |
- Castle Shannon
- Arden
- Vestaburg
- Jeannette
| 1921–1922 | Philadelphia Field Club | 7 | (1) |
| 1925–1930 | Bethlehem Steel | 115 | (43) |
| 1930–1931 | Heart of Midlothian | | |
| 1931 | Newark Americans | 10 | (4) |
- * Club domestic league appearances and goals

Johnny Jaap (August 12, 1895 – May 1, 1974) was a Scottish-American soccer inside right. He played seven seasons in the American Soccer League and one with Hearts. He is a member of the National Soccer Hall of Fame.

Jaap was born in Bellshill, Scotland, and moved to the United States with his family when he was a child. His family settled in Pittsburgh where he grew up playing soccer from a young age. He began his career in 1912 with a series of amateur and semi-professional teams in the Pittsburgh area. In 1921, he moved to Philadelphia Field Club of the first division American Soccer League. His first game came on February 13, 1922, a 5–2 victory over the Fall River Jaap played seven games with Philadelphia, but returned to the minor leagues for several years. In September 1925, Bethlehem Steel signed Jaap. Jaap remained with Bethlehem until it folded in 1930. During that time, Jaap won four league titles with Philadelphia/Bethlehem and the 1926 National Challenge Cup. In the Challenge Cup, a 7–2 win over St. Louis Scullin Steel F.C., Jaap scored one of the Bethlehem goals. After Bethlehem Steel folded, Jaap moved to Scotland for one season with Hearts. He was back in the United States with the Newark Americans for one season.

After retiring from playing, Jaap became a youth coach. He was inducted into the National Soccer Hall of Fame in 1953.

Jaap died in Pittsburgh, Pennsylvania, aged 78.
