= Peter Purden =

Scottish footballer

Personal information
- Place of birth: Scotland
- Position: Inside right

Senior career*
Years	Team	Apps	(Gls)
- Galston
- Bethlehem Steel
- Shawsheen Indians
	Fall River	1	(0)
- * Club domestic league appearances and goals

Peter Purden was a Scottish soccer inside right who played professionally in both Scotland and the United States. He began his professional career with Galston in Scotland before moving to the United States. The exact order of his U.S. career is difficult to follow. He appears to have played briefly with Bethlehem Steel, scored the second goal, a penalty kick, in the Shawsheen Indians 3–0 victory over the Chicago Canadian Club in the 1925 National Challenge Cup and played one game with the Fall River of the American Soccer League during the 1924–1925 season.
