= Saylesville, Rhode Island =

United States historic district

- Saylesville Historic District
- U.S. National Register of Historic Places
- U.S. Historic district
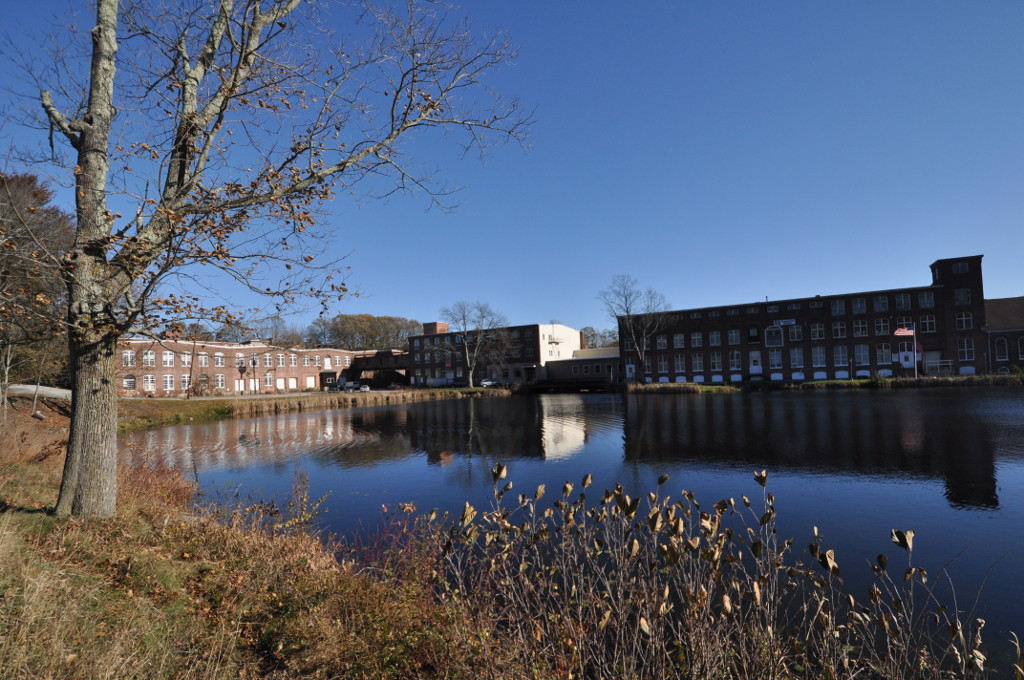
- Saylesville Mills

- Location within Rhode Island Location within the United States
- Location: Lincoln, Rhode Island
- Coordinates: 41°53′55″N 71°24′47″W
- Built: 1854
- Architectural style: Italianate
- MPS: Lincoln MRA
- NRHP reference No.: 84002049
- Added to NRHP: August 30, 1984

Saylesville is a village and historic district in Lincoln, Rhode Island, United States.

== History ==
The area was settled as a farming community in the 17th century. The historic Eleazer Arnold House (built 1693) is located near the village. The Saylesville Meeting House (built 1704) is one of the oldest surviving Quaker (Society of Friends) meeting houses in New England and one of the oldest church buildings in Rhode Island.

In the 19th century, William F. Sayles started the Sayles Bleacheries across from Bleachery Pond at the base of the hill below the neighborhood today known as Saylesville. Saylesville was a mill town, largely built by William Sayles's son Frank Sayles as housing for workers and managers from the textile mill then known as Sayles Finishing Plants. Many of the original single and two family homes survive to this day, though more recent additions to them blur the similarity of the original housing stock. By the 1920s, Frank Sayles had grown the business, largely based in Saylesville/Pawtucket, into one of the largest textile finishing enterprises in the world. When Frank Sayles died in 1920, the decline of the textile industry in the North East was in its infancy. Textile factories began migrating to the south where labor was cheaper and they were closer to their raw materials. Frank Sayles opened his fourth finishing plant in Asheville, North Carolina in 1927.

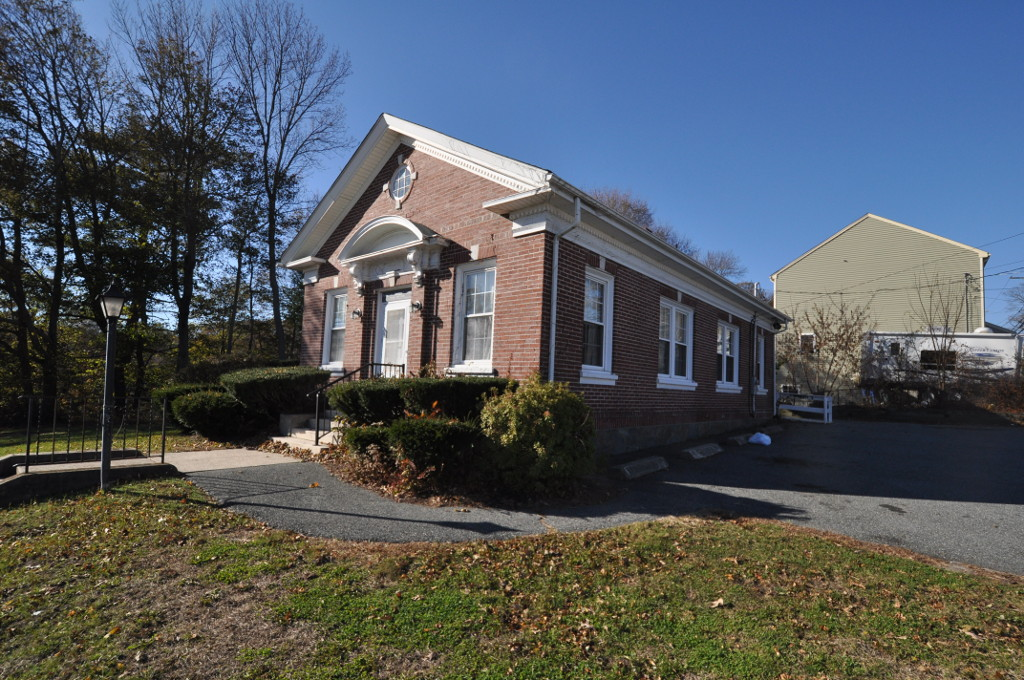
Mill housing, 2017

The mill towns of Rhode Island were already in decline at the time of the union organizing general strike of textile workers of 1934. The violence did not leave Saylesville unscathed. Several thousand workers picketed the mill, though it is thought that few were from the mill itself. "Saylesville has been the center of much of the strike violence during the week, due, authorities say, in the determination of the strikers to close the finishing plant, whose operatives have refused to join the strike." The Moshassuck Cemetery on the hill behind the Sayles Complex was the scene of a bloody confrontation between strikers and the National Guard resulting in many injuries and one fatality when the strikers charged the guardsmen who then opened fire.

The mills finally closed in the 1960s.

William F. Sayles, the businessman and philanthropist who owned the original bleachery mills in Saylesville donated the funds to build Memorial Hospital of Rhode Island in Pawtucket.

In the 1920s, the village was home to a professional soccer team known as the Sayles Finishing Plant F.C.

== Community today ==
The village is home to the Saylesville Fire District, a combination fire department staffed by career, call and volunteer firefighters. It consists of Ladder 5, Engine 5, Engine 6, Utility 5, and Boat 5. The district covers the Saylesville, Fairlawn and Lonsdale villages and the western half of Lincoln Woods State Park.

== Historic district ==
The Saylesville Historic District encompasses significant residential elements of the central mill village, primarily along Chapel and Walker Streets along Saylesville Pond, and extending west on Smithfield Avenue and northwest on Woodland Court. The public buildings of the village are located primarily on Walker Street, which runs east-west south of the pond. The mill worker housing on Chapel and Smithfield are about 1/2 single-family structures and 1/2 multi-unit buildings, either 1-1/2 or 2-1/2 stories in height, built out of either wood or brick. The company made an effort to relieve the uniformity of other mill villages, where identical buildings are in rows, by varying the locations of similar buildings so they were not adjacent. The Saylesville Meetinghouse, an active Friends worship group built in 1703, is on Great Road beyond the end of Chapel Street, and is not part of the historic district. The district was listed on the National Register of Historic Places in 1984.

== See also ==
- National Register of Historic Places listings in Providence County, Rhode Island
