= Vestaburg SC =

Vestaburg S.C. was an amateur U.S. soccer team which existed during the early twentieth century. Based out of Vestaburg, Pennsylvania, they won the 1925 West Penn Challenge Cup, went to the quarterfinals of the 1925 National Challenge Cup and produced three members of the National Soccer Hall of Fame. One of those members, Ralph Caraffi began his career in 1915 with Vestaburg. The other two members were Johnny Jaap and Mike Bookie.
