= Farr Alpaca F.C. =

Farr Alpaca F.C. was an early twentieth-century American soccer team sponsored by the Farr Alpaca textile mill of Holyoke, Massachusetts. The team competed in amateur leagues in western Massachusetts, but experienced some success in national competitions.

Farr Alpaca F.C. played in the Western Massachusetts League beginning in 1909. They made it to the second round of the 1913 American Cup where they lost to Bridgeport F.C. Regarding the 1914 American Cup, a May 9, 1914 Bethlehem Globe article stated, “Bethlehems was ordered to play the strong Farr Alpaca F. C. of Holyoke, Mass., three times champions of Mass.” Despite the plaudits, Bethlehem Steel easily dispatched Farr Alpaca in the second round of the cup. They also lost in the first round of the 1914 National Challenge Cup to New Bedford F.C. In 1915, it lost in the third round of the 1915 American Cup, losing again to Bethlehem Steel. The team continued to compete until at least 1920 when it was paired with United Shoe in the first round of the 1921 National Challenge Cup.

== Honors ==
Massachusetts State Cup

- Runner Up (1): 1915
