= Caledonia F.C. =

U.S. soccer team

Caledonia F.C., also known as Caledonian F.C. or Caleys was a U.S. soccer team from Detroit, Michigan, which had a short period of national prominence in the early 1920s.

== History ==
Caledonia F.C. played in various Michigan amateur leagues. In 1916, it won the Michigan State Association Football League. The team had its greatest success in the National Challenge Cup. Beginning with a quarterfinal showing in 1917, Caledonia F.C. went to the fourth round in 1920, the semifinals in 1921 and 1922 and the third round in 1924.

== Honors ==
Michigan State Association Football League

- Champion (1): 1916

Michigan State Association Clan Campbell Trophy

- Runner Up (1): 1919

Michigan State Cup

- Champion (1): 1922
- Runner Up (2): 1921, 1923
