= 1923–24 National Challenge Cup =

- Dewar Challenge Cup

Tournament details
- Country: United States
- Dates: 1 December 1923 – 30 March 1924

Final positions
- Champions: Fall River F.C. (1st title)
- Runners-up: Vesper Buick
- Semifinalists: Bricklayers and Masons; Bethlehem Steel

The 1923–24 National Challenge Cup was the annual open cup held by the United States Football Association now known as the Lamar Hunt U.S. Open Cup.

== Overview ==
The Fall River F.C. defeated Vesper Buicks of St. Louis by a score of 4–2. Recent film of the final was discovered showing the 36th minute handball by Alex Kemp of the 'Marksmen' which led to Vesper Buicks' first goal. This is also the first known game in which soccer players wore numbers.

== Bracket ==
Home teams listed on top of bracket

Third Round; Dec 1-Jan 1
MO	Vesper Buick	3
MO	Scullin Steel	2
PA	Harmarville Consumers	3
PA	Jeannette	1
OH	Goodyear Tire F.C.	2
OH	Favorite Knits	0
OH	MacKenzie F. C.	3
NY	Rochester Moose	0
ON	Pilgrims F.C.	1-0
OH	Toledo S.C.	1-5
MI	Detroit Celtic
MI	Caledonia F.C.
IL	Thistles F.C.	1
IL	Olympia F.C.	0
IL	Chicago Field Club	0
IL	Bricklayers and Masons	1
PA	Bethlehem Steel	5
PA	Philadelphia Field Club	0
NY	Brooklyn Wanderers	0
NY	New York Field Club	1
CT	Ansonia F.C.	0
NY	New York Giants	1
NJ	Newark Skeeters	3
NJ	BWV Trenton	2
MA	Fall River F.C.	8
RI	Prospect Hill F.C.	1
RI	Fairlawn Rovers	1
RI	Waypoyset	2
MA	Pacific Mills	1-1
MA	Abbot Worsted	1-5
MA	Roxbury	0
MA	Holyoke Falcos	3

Fourth Round; Dec 22-Jan 13
MO	Vesper Buick	3
PA	Harmarville Consumers	0
OH	Goodyear Tire F.C.	1
OH	MacKenzie F. C.	0
OH	Toledo S.C.
MI	Detroit Celtic
IL	Thistles F.C.	1
IL	Bricklayers and Masons	2
PA	Bethlehem Steel	2-4
NY	New York Field Club	2-3
NY	New York Giants	2
NJ	Newark Skeeters	5
MA	Fall River F.C.	3
RI	Waypoyset	0
MA	Abbot Worsted	1
MA	Holyoke Falcos	0

Quarterfinals; Jan 19-Mar 2
MO	Vesper Buick	7
OH	Goodyear Tire F.C.	1
MI	Detroit Celtics	0
IL	Bricklayers and Masons	1
PA	Bethlehem Steel	1-4
NJ	Newark Skeeters	1-0
MA	Abbot Worsted	1
MA	Fall River F.C.	2

Semifinals; March 9–16
MO	Vesper Buick	5
IL	Bricklayers and Masons	0
MA	Fall River F.C.	2
PA	Bethlehem Steel	0

Final; March 30
MO	Vesper Buick	2
MA	Fall River F.C.	4

(*): replay after tied match
w/o: walkover/forfeit victory awarded

== Final ==
March 30, 1924

Vesper Buick (MO)	2–4	Fall River F.C. (MA)
Tim Harris 36' (pen.); McCarthy 52'	Report	Morley 6', 51'; Reid; Brittan

High School Field, St. Louis, Missouri
Attendance: 14,000
Referee: Edward McCabe (USA)

== See also ==
- 1924 American Cup
- 1924 National Amateur Cup
