= Cleveland Thistles =

Cleveland Thistles was an amateur U.S. soccer team which played during the early twentieth century in Cleveland, Ohio.

== History ==
Thistles was established as an amateur team at least as early as October 1906 when it joined Cleveland's first amateur league, the Cleveland Association Football League. From 1911 to 1916, Thistles appeared in the finals of several cups at the city and state level. Additionally, it entered the National Challenge Cup, beginning with the first in 1914 when it eliminated the Niagara Falls Rangers in the first round. In 1915, Thistles went to the third round of the Challenge Cup and in 1916, to the quarterfinals. The team then fell on hard times and the next mention in the national press came in 1925 when Thistles was eliminated by Chicago Canadian Club in the semifinals of the weakened 1925 National Challenge Cup.

== Honors ==
Bowler Cup

- Champion (2): 1912, 1916
- Runner Up (1): 1911

Ohio State Association Cup

- Runner Up (1): 1916

American Federation of Labor Cup (Cleveland)

- Runner Up (1): 1913
