= 1922–23 American Cup =

Soccer tournament

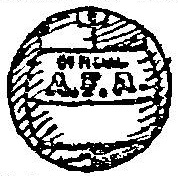

Tournament details
- Country: United States
- Dates: October 1922 – May 1923
- Teams: 37

Final positions
- Champions: Fleisher Yarn (1st title)
- Runners-up: J. & P. Coats

The 1922–23 American Cup was the thirty–first edition of the annual challenge cup held by the American Football Association. The Secretary of the AFA, Andrew Beveridge received entries up to October 7, 1922. This season the American Cup was won by Fleisher Yarn, an amateur team from Philadelphia. En route to the championship they overcame American Soccer League heavyweights like Bethlehem Steel, J. & P. Coats and National Cup winners, Paterson F.C.

== Preliminary round ==
The draw for the preliminary and first round took place on October 7, 1922 at the cup committee meeting in Newark, NJ. Games were due to be played by October 29.

Southern New England

November 5, 1922

Prospect Hill	2–3	J. & P. Coats #1
White; 75' Slater		20', 85' Gallagher; Shepherd

John St. grounds, Valley Falls, RI
Attendance: 1500
Referee: Odell

Western Massachusetts and Northern Connecticut

October 28, 1922

Holyoke	6–2	Manchester
James Brown (3); John Brown; Horne; Walter Dowdall		Wilson (2)

Beech St grounds, Holyoke, MA
Attendance: 400
Referee: William A. Carsairs (West Springfield)

Connecticut and New Jersey

October 1922

Ryerson	–	Babcock & Wilcox

October 15, 1922

Paterson	7–0	Entre Nous
7', 47' Hemingsley; Fryer; 35' Duggan; 57', 2H' McKenna; 72' Scott

Olympic Park, Paterson, NJ
Referee: W. Patrick

Pennsylvania District

October 28, 1922

Hibernian	0–2	Fairhill
		6' Fleming; Smith (pk)

Philadelphia, PA
Referee: A. Watson

== First round ==
The first-round games were due to be played by November 12.

Southern New England

November 11, 1922

Canadian	1–5	Fairlawn Rovers
Scott (2); Travis; Smith (2)		Barrett

Lindsey Field, Pawtucket, RI
Attendance: 1200
Referee: J. Carlin
November 11, 1922

J. & P. Coats #2	0–3	Sayles Finishing
		Dixon; 55' Wilson; 75' Pilkington

Lonsdale grounds, Pawtucket, RI
Attendance: 1200
Referee: Bob Carroll
November 11, 1922

Greystone Blues	1–6	J. & P. Coats #1
Gregson (pk)		12' Gallagher; Nelson; Shephard; Lappin (3)

Centredale grounds, Providence, RI
Referee: White
November 30, 1922

West End Polish	3–0	Greystone Vets
25' Campanelli; Lukouic; Barone

Crompton, RI
Referee: Odell

Northern Massachusetts

November 11, 1922

Methuen	6–0	South Boston Rangers

Methuen, MA
November 11, 1922

Clan Sutherland	1–0	Charlestown
Allan Wilson

Buick Field, Boston, MA
Referee: R. Ritchie
November 11, 1922

Fore River	4–1	American Woolen
10' Lyons; 30' Oakley; 1H', 2H' Page		Jones

Fore River Field, Quincy, MA
Referee: S. McLerie
November 18, 1922

General Electric United	0–3	Abbot Worsted
		Lee (2); Brown

Cooper ground, West Lynn
Referee: Russell

Western Massachusetts and Northern Connecticut

November 11, 1922

Ludlow Thistle	2–4	Falco
Milne; Martin		30' Ford; Downie; Jenkins (pk); Logan (pk)

Whitney park, Ludlow, MA
Referee: T. Prout (Holyoke)
November 25, 1922

Chicopee Rovers	0–4	Holyoke
		28', 30', 65' John Brown; Dowdall

Lincoln Grove, Chicopee Falls
Referee: John Bain (Holyoke)

Connecticut and New Jersey

November 7, 1922

Paterson	5–1	Bayonne Rovers
15' Rudy Hunziker; 40', 70' Murray; 55' Tommy Duggan (pk); Scott		Cosgrove

Olympic Park, Paterson, NJ
Referee: Charles Ward
November 12, 1922

Babcock & Wilcox	2–4	American A.A.
Forrester; Harding		5' Florie 2 Durkin 2

B. & W. Field, Bayonne
November 19, 1922

St. George	1–2	Paterson Caledonian
Kilroy		Walter Freebairn (2)

Meadows, Bridgeport, CT
Referee: Joseph Smith
November 26, 1922

Harrison	3–0	Antler
15' Rhody; McCartin (2)

Hyatt Field, Harrison, NJ
Referee: Lowry

Pennsylvania

November 11, 1922

Fleisher Yarn	3–2	Bethlehem Steel
25' McLaughlin (pk); 70' Purvis; 95' McLaughlin		70' Goldie; 75' Terris

Philadelphia, PA
Referee: George Young (Philadelphia)
November 19, 1922

Fairhill	1–1	Barney Ernst
Smith		D. Robinson

Philadelphia, PA
Referee: Danny Oates

replay

December 2, 1922

Fairhill	1–0	Barney Ernst
3' Hunt (pk)

JJ Dobson Field, Philadelphia, PA
Referee: Danny Oates

== Second round ==
The second-round games were due to be played by December 3. The Harrison/Paterson match was delayed multiple times for weather/field conditions ultimately both teams had few open dates remaining with many ASL fixtures remaining.

Southern New England

December 25, 1922

J. & P. Coats	6–0	West End Polish
Fleming (pk); Brooks; Morley; Gilmore; Neilson

Coats Field, Pawtucket, RI
Attendance: 2000
Referee: Fred O'Dell
April 1, 1923

Sayles Finishing	4–3	Fairlawn Rovers
Pilkington (3); OT' Dixon		1H', 78' E. Smith; Tickle

Kinsley Park, Providence, RI
Attendance: 1500
Referee: Robert Carroll

Northern Massachusetts

December 16, 1922

Fore River	2–1	Methuen
5' Dave Christie; Oakley		Morley

Quincy Point, MA
Referee: White (Allston)
April 7, 1923

Abbot Worsted	3–1	Clan Sutherland
10', 12', ?' Corrigan		Sammy Ritchie

Forge Village, MA
Referee: R. Ritchie (Boston)

Western Massachusetts and Northern Connecticut

December 2, 1922

Falco	0–1	Holyoke
		70' Horne

Falco Field, Holyoke, MA
Attendance: 500
Referee: William A. Carstairs (Springfield)

Connecticut and New Jersey

December 2, 1922

Harrison	–	Paterson

April 15, 1923

Paterson Caledonian	0–5	American A.A.
		20' Florie; 21', 24' J. Strong; 1H', 75' Coe

Olympic Park, Paterson, NJ
Referee: Charles Ward (Passaic)

Pennsylvania District

December 9, 1922

Fairhill	0–1	Fleisher Yarn
		Andy Stradan

JJ Dobson Field, Philadelphia, PA
Referee: Danny Oates

== Third round ==
The third-round games were due to be played by April 8. The Sayles–Coats game was ordered replayed because of an ineligible player. Sayles refused to replay the game. The Pateson/Holyoke match was not played due to late season fixture congestion. Holyoke was withdrawn and offered a share in the gate of the cup final.

April 8, 1923

Paterson	w/o	Holyoke

Paterson, NJ
April 15, 1923

Sayles Finishing	2–1	J. & P. Coats
37' Pilkington; Red Britton		17' Tommy Fleming (pk)

Kinsley Park, Providence, RI
Referee: Robert Carrol
April 19, 1923

Fore River	3–2	Abbot Worsted
Joe Black (pk); 2H', OT' Drummond		11' Corrigan; Parker

Quincy, MA
Referee: Robert Ritchie (Roslindale)
April 21, 1923

Fleischer Yarn	3–1	American A.A.

Philadelphia, PA

replay

April 25, 1923

J. & P. Coats	w/o	Sayles Finishing

== Semifinals ==
April 29, 1923	Paterson	1–3	Fleisher Yarn	Paterson, NJ
	70' Joe Reynolds (pk)		30' Purvis; 77', 87' Stradan	Stadium: Olympic Park; Attendance: 1500; Referee: Robert McMahon (Newark)
Note: Other source shows score 28', 85' Andy Stradden, 80' Olec McLaughlin

April 29, 1923

J. & P. Coats	4–0	Fore River
29' Gallagher; Fleming; 47' McAvoy; Bethune

Kinsley Park, Providence, RI
Referee: W. Norse (New Bedford)

== Final ==

The final took place May 6, 1923 at Mark's Stadium in North Tiverton, RI. Fleisher Yarn of Philadelphia defeated J.& P. Coats of Pawtucket. The Coats aggregation along with making the AFA final were the American Soccer League champions and National Challenge Cup semifinalists. Fleisher Yarn had thirty–four victories on the season winning the Allied First Division of Philadelphia. They only suffered three exhibition losses with their only competitive loss to Bethlehem Steel in the second round of the National Cup. Along with the American Cup win, they went on undefeated runs in the Allied Amateur and National Amateur Cups, though neither tournament was completed, they reached the final and quarterfinals respectively.

May 6, 1923

Fleisher Yarn	2–0	J&P Coats
30' Stradden; 70' Stradden

Mark's Stadium, Tiverton, RI
Attendance: 7000
Referee: Joseph Smith

== Champions ==

Fleisher Yarn American Cup champions 1922–23.

Front row: J. Malley, Purvis, Andy Staden, B. McLaughlin, J. Galloway.
Second row: Coleman, White (Captain), Duffy.
Standing: R. Rodgers, William Kucklick, William Fleming.

== See also ==
- 1923 National Challenge Cup
- 1923 National Amateur Cup
- 1922–23 American Soccer League
