= Fairlawn Rovers =

Fairlawn Rovers was a U.S. soccer team which existed from at least 1918 to at least 1949. It was based in Fairlawn, Rhode Island.

== Leagues ==
There is very little information on the leagues Fairlawn Rovers belonged to over the years. In 1922, they won the Pawtucket and District League. Then, in 1934, it entered the New England Division of the American Soccer League for two seasons. The latest mention of Fairlawn Rovers comes in the biography of David Pacheo, a member of the Connecticut Soccer Hall of Fame. It mentions that, “In 1948-49 he was a key member of the Fall River Soccer Club and the Fairlawn Rovers of Rhode Island.”

== Regional cups ==
During the late 1910s and early 1920s, Fairlawn Rovers was a dominant team in Southern New England. Between 1918 and 1921, it won three consecutive Southern New England Soccer Association Guy Norman Cups and lost to Sayles Finishing Plant F.C. in the 1921 Times Cup. In 1924 the Rovers won the Southern New England Soccer Association Times Cup.

== National Challenge Cup ==
Fairlawn’s success went beyond local cups. In 1921, it fell to Tebo Yacht Basin F.C. in the quarterfinals of the National Challenge Cup. Then in 1922 it went to the fourth round and the third round in 1923.
