= Ralph Caraffi =

American soccer player (1901–1978)

Ralph Carrafi
Personal information
- Date of birth: January 19, 1901
- Place of birth: Dunlevy, Pennsylvania, U.S.
- Date of death: January 1, 1978 (aged 76)
- Place of death: Cleveland, Ohio, U.S.
- Position: Midfielder

Senior career*
Years	Team	Apps	(Gls)
1915–1917	Vestaburg		
1919–1921	Fall River Rovers		
1921–1922	Fall River United	6	(1)
1926–1929	American Hungarians		
1929–1934	Bruell Insurance		

Managerial career
- 1935–1938: Bartunek Clothes
- * Club domestic league appearances and goals

Ralph Caraffi (January 19, 1901 – January 1, 1978) was an American soccer player who played as a midfielder. Caraffi played one season in the professional American Soccer League. The remainder of his nineteen-year career was with semi-professional and amateur leagues. Caraffi is a member of the National Soccer Hall of Fame.

== Career ==
Caraffi was born in Dunlevy, Pennsylvania. In 1915, at the age of fifteen, he began playing with the semi-professional Vestaburg which competed in an obscure Pennsylvania league. He left Vestaburg in 1917 after which there is a two-year gap in the record of his career. However, the U.S. involvement in World War I caused the suspension of several leagues due to the loss of players to military service. Caraffi's National Soccer Hall of Fame profile notes that he played for the U.S. Army team in Europe and this may account for those missing two years. In 1919, Caraffi signed with the Fall River Rovers of the semi-professional Southern New England Soccer League. He spent two seasons with the Rovers until the team and the league folded in 1921. That occurred in response to the establishment of the American Soccer League which was formed by several of the top SNESL and National Association Football League teams. The Rovers were disbanded and a new, fully professional, team, Fall River United was formed and entered the ASL. Caraffi moved to Fall River United, playing six games that season. There is another between 1922 and 1926 when he is on record as playing for the semi-professional American Hungarians of the Northeastern Ohio major league in Cleveland, Ohio. In 1929, Caraffi joined Cleveland Bruell Insurance in the newly established Midwest Professional Soccer League. In 1930, Bruell Insurance went to the final of the National Challenge Cup before falling to the Fall River F.C.

== Later life ==
After retiring from playing in 1934, Caraffi became a youth soccer coach with Bartunek Clothes for three years. He was also a referee from 1954 to 1957.

Caraffi was inducted as one of the first classes into the National Soccer Hall of Fame in 1959 and the Greater Cleveland Sports Hall of Fame in 1992.

His wife continued to live in the Cleveland area until her death in 2008. His family still resides in the Greater Cleveland Area.
