= Farr Alpaca Company =

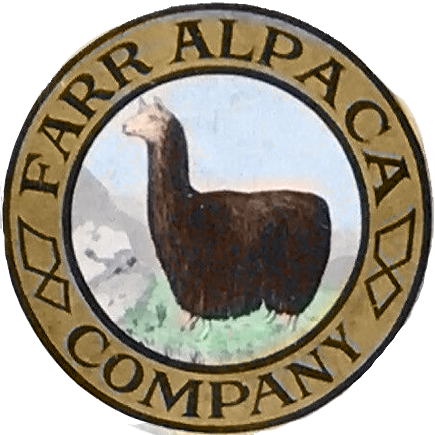

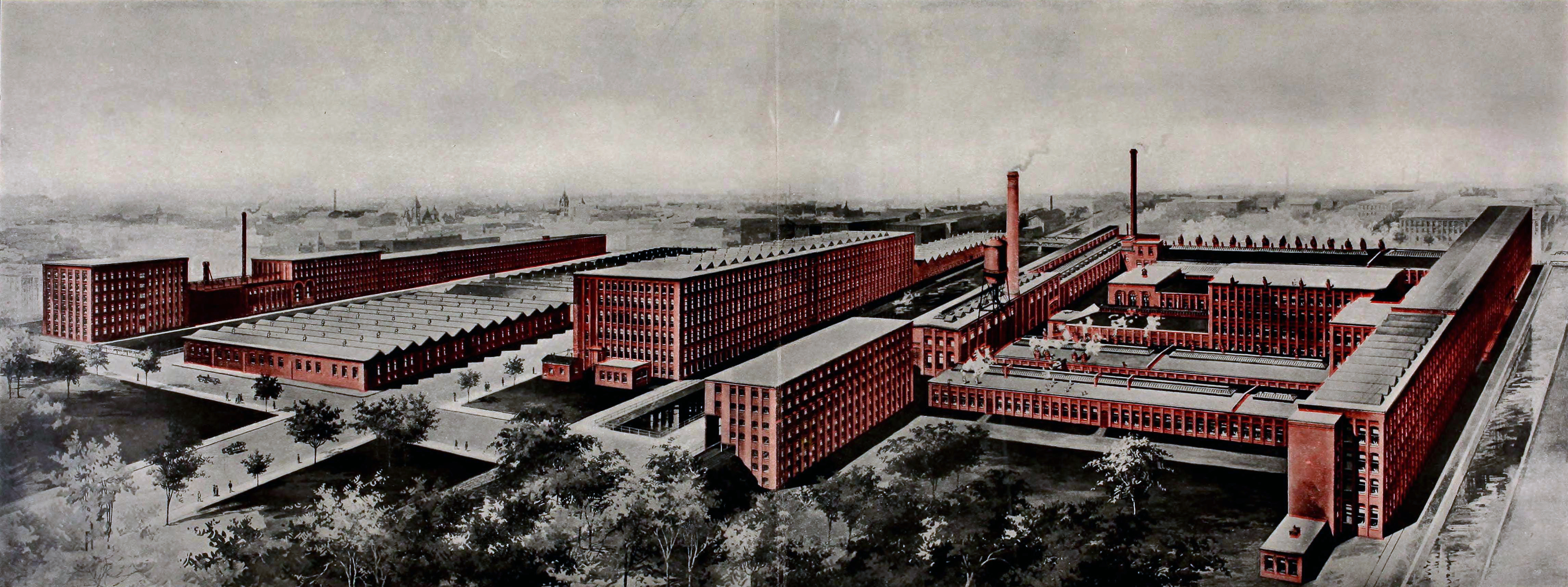
- Mills and offices of the Farr Alpaca Company, as they appeared in 1912
- Formerly: Randall Farr Company
- Type: Private
- Industry: Textiles
- Founded: 1864; 162 years ago in Hespeler, Ontario
- Defunct: 1939
- Headquarters: Holyoke, Massachusetts, United States
- Area served: Worldwide
- Key people: Herbert M. Farr (Founder)

The Farr Alpaca Company was a Canadian and subsequently American textile manufacturer specializing in alpaca and mohair worsted woolen products. Established initially in 1864 as the Randall Farr Company in Hespeler, Ontario, the company was subsequently moved to Holyoke, Massachusetts to avoid tariffs brought on by the Wool and Woolens Act of 1867, and was established as the Farr Alpaca Company in 1874. The Farr family managed to build the company into a dominant brand in the woolen goods market in large part by relying on secrecy; rather than patenting machinery, the company would make use of machine shops with familial ties in the city, paying laborers well and keeping knowledge of components limited across units, such that no one worker could completely duplicate their processes. By the beginning of the 20th century the company had the largest alpaca woolen mill in the world and was a dominant producer in its industry. Unable to adapt to a changing market, the company eventually ceased production in 1939, and was formally dissolved by 1942. The company is remembered today for its role in the creation of the first professional soccer league in the United States the American Soccer League, as its Farr Alpaca F.C. served as a direct predecessor to the Holyoke Falcos, one of the league's founding teams.
