= Arden F.C. =

Amateur soccer team

Arden F.C. was an amateur U.S. soccer team from Pittsburgh, Pennsylvania that went to the quarterfinals of the 1922 National Challenge Cup and the semifinals of the 1923 National Challenge Cup. National Soccer Hall of Fame member Johnny Jaap played for Arden early in his career.
