= 1922–23 National Challenge Cup =

- Dewar Challenge Cup

Tournament details
- Country: United States
- Dates: 12 November 1922- 1 April 1923

Final positions
- Champions: Paterson F.C. (1st title)
- Runners-up: Scullin Steel
- Semifinalists: Arden F.C.; J&P Coats
- *Paterson declared Champion after Scullin Steel refused rematch

The 1922–23 National Challenge Cup was the annual open cup held by the United States Football Association now known as the Lamar Hunt U.S. Open Cup.

== Bracket ==
Home teams listed on top of bracket

Third Round; Nov 12-Dec 31
NJ	Paterson F.C.	2
NJ	American A.A.	0
CT	Hartford F.C.	4
NY	Hispano FC	3
NY	New York Field Club	9
CT	Bridgeport City F.C.	3
PA	Bethlehem Steel	3
PA	Fairhill F.C.	0
RI	J&P Coats	4
MA	Greystone F.C.	0
CT	Ansonia F.C.	3
MA	Whitman Mills	2
MA	Fore River	5
MA	Holyoke Falcos	1
MA	Abbot Worsted	9
MA	Roxbury F.C.	0
MO	Scullin Steel	0-3
MO	Vesper Buick	0-2
MO	St. Leo's	3
MO	Prendergast F.C.	0
IL	Bricklayers and Masons	2
OH	Goodyear Tire F.C.	0
IL	Thistles	2
IL	Sparta Union	1
PA	Arden F.C.	3
NY	Kodak Park F.C.	0
OH	Magyar-American	0
OH	Lorain Eagles	1
MI	Walkerville F.C.	4
MI	Industrial F.C.	3
PA	Jeannette F.C.	3
MI	Roses F.C.	0

Fourth Round; Dec 23-Feb 10
NJ	Paterson F.C.	6
CT	Hartford F.C.	0
NY	New York Field Club	4
PA	Bethlehem Steel	1
RI	J&P Coats	6
CT	Ansonia F.C.	0
MA	Fore River	0
MA	Abbot Worsted	4
MO	Scullin Steel	3
MO	St. Leo's	1
IL	Bricklayers and Masons	2
IL	Thistles	0
PA	Arden F.C.	5
OH	Lorain Eagles	0
MI	Walkerville F.C.	1
PA	Jeannette F.C.	3

Quarterfinals; Jan 28-Mar 18
NJ	Paterson F.C.	0-4
NY	New York Field Club	0-1
RI	J&P Coats	1
CT	Abbot Worsted	0
MO	Scullin Steel	3
IL	Bricklayers and Masons	1
PA	Arden F.C.	1
PA	Jeannette F.C.	0

Semifinals; Feb 25, Mar 25
NJ	Paterson F.C.	3
RI	J&P Coats	2
MO	Scullin Steel	2
PA	Arden F.C.	1

Final; April 1
NJ	Paterson F.C.	2-w/o
MO	Scullin Steel	2

(*): replay after tied match
w/o: walkover/forfeit victory awarded

== Final ==
April 1, 1923

Paterson F.C. (NJ)	2–2	Scullin Steel (MO)
Duggan; Hemingsley 84' (McKenna)		Brannigan 38'; Schwartz 57' (Rooney)

Federal Park, Harrison, New Jersey
Attendance: 15,000
Referee: J.B. Stark (USA)
- Paterson F.C. was declared the winner when Scullin Steel declined to replay the game. Many of Scullin's players played professional baseball and left to join their teams, depleting Scullin to the point it would not have fielded a competitive team.

== See also ==
- 1923 American Cup
- 1923 National Amateur Cup

== Sources ==
- USOpenCup.com
