= Fairlawn, Rhode Island =

Village in Rhode Island, United States

Coordinates: 41°52′34″N 71°24′46″W

Fairlawn is a neighborhood in Pawtucket, Rhode Island, United States.

== History ==
Fairlawn was initially part of Providence, Rhode Island. In the mid-1700s, a group of farmers from the northern part of Providence petitioned to have the area incorporated as a separate town. On June 13, 1765 a measure was passed establishing North Providence as its own town. Over time, the borders of North Providence shifted, and in 1874, Fairlawn became part of Pawtucket.

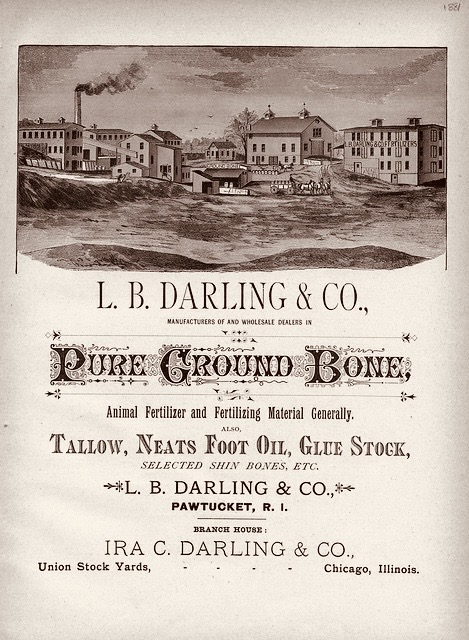
L. B. Darling & Co 1881 Advertisement

Fairlawn was largely rural until the end of the 19th century, consisting mainly of farmland. The main industry present in the area during this time was a facility operated by Lucius B. Darling. Darling's business began as a slaughterhouse where all parts of slaughtered animals were used-- products included meat, tallow, glue, and fertilizer. As the business grew, Darling's focus narrowed to primarily manufacture fertilizers and bone meal. The business prospered, and Darling established a second branch of the business in Chicago, Illinois in 1884.

In 1871, St. Francis Cemetery was established as a Catholic cemetery. The cemetery remains operational under the Roman Catholic Diocese of Providence.

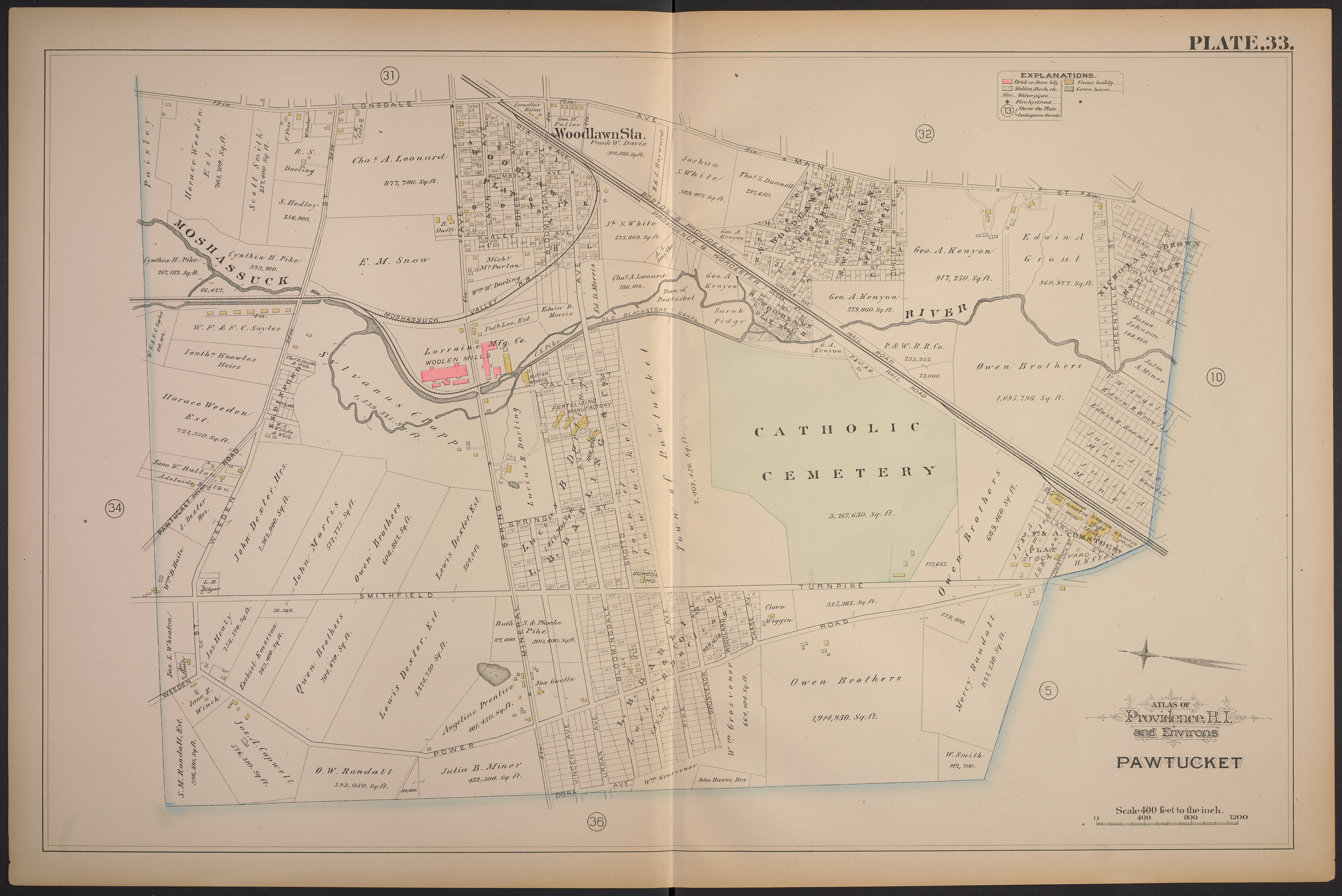
1882 Map of Pawtucket's Fairlawn and Woodlawn neighborhoods.

By the 1880s, the area between Mineral Spring Ave and Grosvenor Ave had been subdivided from Dora Ave eastward, though an 1882 atlas shows limited development on the subdivided plots. By 1895, the area north of Francis Street had been subdivided as well, though much of the divided plots remained undeveloped. Housing development during the early urbanization of Fairlawn was clustered along Weeden Street between Smithfield Ave and Alder Street (then called "Elder Street"). However, much of Fairlawn remained undeveloped, and a handful of families held sizeable tracts of undeveloped land; with the Dexter, Randall, Darling, and Clapp families holding much of the land in Fairlawn.

Following the establishment of the Home Owner's Loan Corporation in 1933, maps were drawn up of many American cities, including Pawtucket, categorizing neighborhoods by "risk level" for purposes of mortgage lending. Per a 1939 he northern end of Fairlawn was identified as among the "best" areas of Pawtucket and the southern end of Fairlawn was deemed "desirable". This area consisted largely of private residential development housing middle class families.

Much of the neighborhood's housing stock was built between 1895 and 1950; 53.9% of housing in Fairlawn was built prior to 1950.

== Demographics ==
=== 2020 Census ===
As of the 2020 census, Fairlawn had a population of 7,474. The population density of the neighborhood was 6,228.3 per square mile. Fairlawn contained 3,124 housing units at an average density of 2,603.3 per square mile. 2,982 housing units, or 95.5% were occupied and 142, or 4.5%, were vacant. The racial composition as of the census is documented in the table below.

Racial composition as of the 2020 census
Race	Number	Percent
White	3,588	48.00%
Black or African American	1,043	14.96%
American Indian and Alaska Native	36	0.48%
Asian	113	1.51%
Native Hawaiian and Other Pacific Islander	7	0.09%
Some other race	1,309	17.51%
Two or more races	1,378	18.44%
Hispanic or Latino (of any race)	1,497	20.03%

== Geography ==
Fairlawn has an area of 1.2 square miles. Fairlawn is bordered by Providence to the south, North Providence to the west, Lincoln to the North, and the Moshassuck River to the east. The highest point in Pawtucket, at a height of 184ft above sea level, is located in southwest Fairlawn, on the northeast slope of Windmill Hill; at the Pawtucket/North Providence border between Gorizia Street and Toledo Ave.

== Transportation ==
Two toll roads crossed the area in the 1800s-- the Mineral Spring Turnpike (present day Mineral Spring Ave/Rhode Island Route 15), and Smithfield Turnpike (present day Smithfield Ave/Rhode Island Route 126). Smithfield Ave and Mineral Spring Ave remain major thoroughfares in the neighborhood.

The Blackstone Canal passed through the eastern edge of Fairlawn.

In the early 1900s, Fairlawn was served by three streetcar lines. These lines ran along Mineral Spring Ave, Smithfield Ave, and Weeden Street.

Today the neighborhood is served by two RIPTA bus routes, routes 72 and 73. The routes provide direct access to Central Falls, downtown Pawtucket, downtown Providence, Providence's Hospital District, and CCRI's Lincoln Campus. Additionally, these routes stop at nearby transit hubs; Providence Station, Pawtucket-Central Falls Train Station, and Kennedy Plaza.

== Education ==
Between 1870 and 1882 the Smithfield Ave School was established at the corner of Smithfield Ave and Grotto Ave. In 1918, the Smithfield Ave School was replaced by Nathanael Greene Elementary School.

Nathanael Greene Elementary School is located at 285 Smithfield Avenue. The school was built in 1918 and renovated in 2017; it is named after American revolutionary major Nathanael Greene. The school serves 448 students between grades pre-K and 5. In 2015, Nathanael Greene Elementary School began to roll out a dual-language education program, allowing students to build proficiency in both English and Spanish.

Fairlawn was home to a private all-girls Catholic high school, Bishop Keough Regional High School, located at 145 Power Road. The school was operational from 1971 to 2015; in 2015 merged with a coeducational private Catholic high school, St. Raphael Academy, located in Pawtucket's Quality Hill neighborhood.

A new public charter school, MedPrep Charter School, was proposed in 2023. MedPrep planned to utilize the former Bishop Kenough High School building for its school. The proposed school would serve grades 6-12 with a focus on preparing students for careers in the medical field. As of October 2025, the application filed with Rhode Island's Department of Education for the proposed school had been withdrawn by the applicant.

Fairlawn is served by the Pawtucket School Department.

== Recreation and culture ==
Fairlawn is home to Veteran's Memorial Park-- a 20 acre public park which includes a playground, public swimming pool, picnic areas, six baseball fields, one basketball court, four tennis courts, and a dog park.

A smaller park- San Bento Playground and Smithfield Ave Basketball Courts- are located on Smithfield Ave between Morris Street and Owen Street.

Fairlawn hosts an annual tree lighting ceremony to celebrate the winter holiday season. A large conifer tree in front of Nathanael Greene Elementary School is draped in Christmas lights; the event celebrates these lights being turned on for the holiday season. The tree lighting features live entertainment, typically including Nathanael Greene Elementary School's student chorus. Seasonal sweets-- hot cocoa and cookies-- are given to attendees. Actors dressed as Santa Claus and Mrs. Claus are present for the event.

The historic Fairlawn Rovers, a professional soccer team, was based in Fairlawn from at least 1918 to at least 1949.

Veteran's Memorial Park is home to The Slaterettes, the oldest running all-female baseball league in the United States, as well as a local youth football league, the Fairlawn Cardinals.

The neighborhood is home to several restaurants, shops, and a local brewery.
