= Homestead F.C. =

Homestead Steel Workers Football Club, better known as Homestead F.C. was the company soccer team for the Homestead Steel Works of Homestead, Pennsylvania. It played in a variety of local amateur and semi-professional soccer leagues in Western Pennsylvania. In 1915, Homestead won the Pittsburgh and District Association Football League (PDAFL) and in 1916 took the Western Pennsylvania State Cup. In 1915, 1917 and 1919, Homestead was knocked out of the National Challenge Cup by Bethlehem Steel.

== Year-by-year ==
Year	League	Reg. season	National Challenge Cup
1914–15	PDAFL	1st	Semifinal
1915–16	?	?	?
1916–17	?	?	Quarterfinal
1917–18	?	?	Second round
1918–19	?	?	Third round

== Honors ==
League Championship

- Winner (1): 1915

Western Pennsylvania State Cup

- Winner (1): 1916
