= Harvey F.C. =

U.S. soccer team

Harvey F.C. was an early twentieth century U.S. soccer team from Harvey, Illinois.

== History ==
Harvey F.C. competed in the Association Football League of Chicago in 1909–1910, finishing tied for third out of eight teams. The team also won the 1917 Peel Cup, went to the fourth round of the 1921 National Challenge Cup and the quarterfinals of the 1925 National Challenge Cup. A team by the name of Harvey United won the 1935 Peel Cup, but it is unknown if there is any relationship between it and Harvey F.C.

== Year-by-year ==
Year	League	Reg. season	Peel Cup
1909/10	AFLC	4th	?

== Honors ==
Peel Cup

- Winners (2): 1917
