= Edmund Smith (soccer) =

American soccer player

Eddie Smith
Personal information
- Full name: Edmund Smith
- Date of birth: October 23, 1902
- Place of birth: Arbroath, Scotland
- Date of death: August 7, 1978 (aged 75)
- Place of death: Andover, Massachusetts, United States
- Position: Forward

Senior career*
Years	Team	Apps	(Gls)
- Arbroath
–1926	Shawsheen Indians	22	(9)
1926	Bethlehem Steel	4	(3)
1926–	Holley Carburetor		

International career
1926	United States	1	(0)
- * Club domestic league appearances and goals

Edmund "Eddie" Smith (October 25, 1902 – August 7, 1978) was a soccer player who played as a forward. He played professionally in both Scotland and the United States. Born in Scotland, he earned one cap for the United States national team.

== Professional ==
Smith played for Scottish club Arbroath F.C. before moving to the United States where he signed with the Shawsheen Indians of Andover, Massachusetts. In 1925, the Indians won the U S Open Cup 3–0 over the Canadian Club of Chicago. In 1926, the Indians entered the American Soccer League, but folded twenty-six games into the 1926–1927 season. In 1926, Smith joined Bethlehem Steel. He played only four league games, scoring three goals, before moving to Detroit, Michigan. He continued to play in the Michigan Professional League playing for Holley Carburetor.

== Soccer career ==
When he moved to Detroit, Smith played for Holly Carburetor and the Ford Motor Company. He later moved back to Andover where he worked as a caretaker of the Spring Grove Cemetery.

== National team ==
Smith earned one cap with the U.S. national team in a 6–2 win over Canada on November 6, 1926. Played at Ebbets Field N.Y.

== See also ==
- List of United States men's international soccer players born outside the United States
