= Magyar-American F.C. =

Magyar-American F.C. was an early twentieth century U.S. soccer team from Cleveland, Ohio.

The team was formed in 1906 by Hungarian Americans. In October 1906, they joined Cleveland’s first amateur soccer league. From 1919 to 1927, the team experienced some success in the National Challenge Cup. In 1919 and 1923 they went to the third round and in 1927, to the quarterfinals.
