= Sayles Finishing Plant F.C. =

American soccer team

Sayles Finishing Plant F.C. was a U.S. soccer team which existed briefly during the early 1920s.

The team was sponsored by the Sayles Finishing Plant, a textile company owned by the Sayles Company and based out of Saylesville, Rhode Island. In 1920, it joined the Southern New England Soccer League, taking fourth place and withdrawing at the end of the season. That year, the team went at least as far as the second round of the National Challenge Cup. It also won the 1921 Southern New England Association Cup, defeating Fairlawn Rovers 1-0 in overtime. In 1925, the team went to the quarterfinals of the National Challenge Cup.

== Record ==
| Year | Record | League | National Challenge Cup |
|---|---|---|---|
| 1920-1921 | 4-9-1 | 4th | Second round |

== Honors ==
Southern New England Association Times Cup

- Winner (1): 1921
