= St. Louis Scullin Steel F.C. =

St. Louis Scullin Steel
- Full name: St. Louis Scullin Steel Football Club
- Nickname: Scullin
- Founded: 1918
- Dissolved: 1925; 101 years ago
- Ground: St. Louis, Missouri
- Owner: The Scullin Steel Company
- League: St. Louis Soccer League
- 1924–25: 3rd.

St. Louis Scullin Steel F.C. was a U.S. soccer team established in St. Louis, Missouri in 1918. It spent seven seasons in the St. Louis Soccer League, winning three league titles and one National Challenge Cup.

== History ==
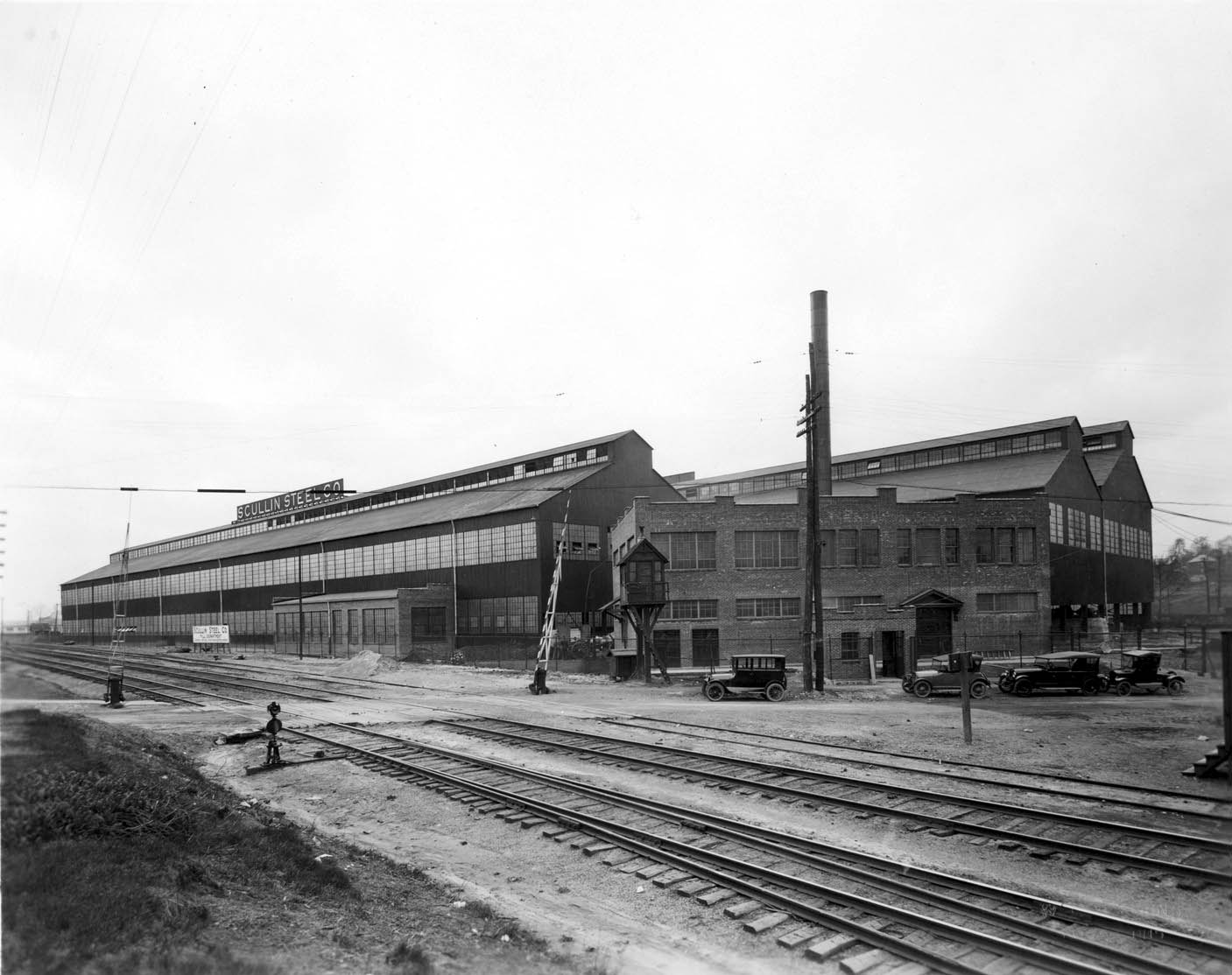
The team was established by The Scullin Steel Co. (pictured)

In 1918, The Scullin Steel Company of St. Louis entered a team in the St. Louis Soccer League. The team surged to the top of the league, winning the title only to fall to the bottom the next season. It came back in the 1920-21 season to take the league title for a second time.

That year, Scullin Steel also went to the 1921 National Challenge Cup championship, falling 4-2 to Brooklyn Robins Dry Dock. Scullin Steel repeated as league champion for the 1921-1922 season and won the 1922 National Challenge Cup in a 3-2 victory over Todd Shipyards.

While it finished second in the league standings the next season, Scullin Steel went to a third consecutive Challenge Cup final. This time, it forfeited to Paterson F.C. after the first game ended in a 2-2 tie.

Scullin Steel chose to return to St. Louis when several players left the team in order to join their professional baseball teams. Scullin finished third in the league standings the next two seasons and in 1925 did not enter the Challenge Cup after the American Soccer League and St. Louis Soccer League chose to boycott it.

== Record ==
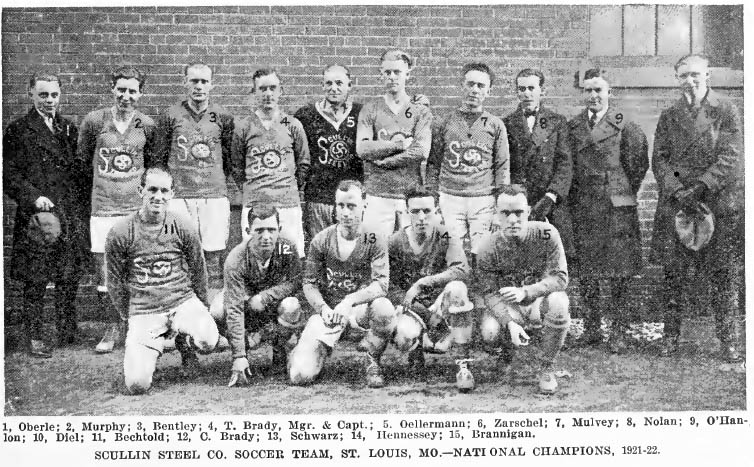
The team that won the 1922 U.S. Open Cup

Season	Record	League	National Cup
1918–19	10–6–5	Champion	did not participate
1919–20	7–10–4	4th	Third round
1920–21	9–5–3	Champion	Runners-up
1921–22	10–6–5	Champion	Champion
1922–23	5–5–7	2nd	Runners-up
1923–24	3–6–4	3rd	Third round
1924–25	4–7–7	3rd	did not participate
