= Alex Kemp (footballer) =

Scottish footballer

Personal information
- Place of birth: Scotland
- Position: Full back

Senior career*
Years	Team	Apps	(Gls)
–1921	Grand Trunk Railway		
1921–1922	Boleil		
1922–1925	Fall River	75	(0)
1925	New Bedford Whalers	2	(0)
1925	Philadelphia	1	(0)
- Holley Carburetor
- * Club domestic league appearances and goals

Alex Kemp was a Scottish association football full back who played professionally in Canada and the United States.

Kemp began his career in Canada, playing for Grand Trunk Railway and Boleil. In 1922, he joined the Fall River of the American Soccer League. In 1924, Kemp played on the backline for the 'Marksmen' when they defeated St. Louis Vesper Buick in the final of the 1924 National Challenge Cup. Kemp's handball in the area led to Vesper Buick's first goal in the 36th minute. In 1925, he played two games for the New Bedford Whalers and one for Philadelphia Field Club before moving to Detroit and joining Holley Carburetor F.C.
