= Brookside Historic District =

Historic district in Massachusetts, United States

- U.S. National Register of Historic Places
- U.S. Historic district
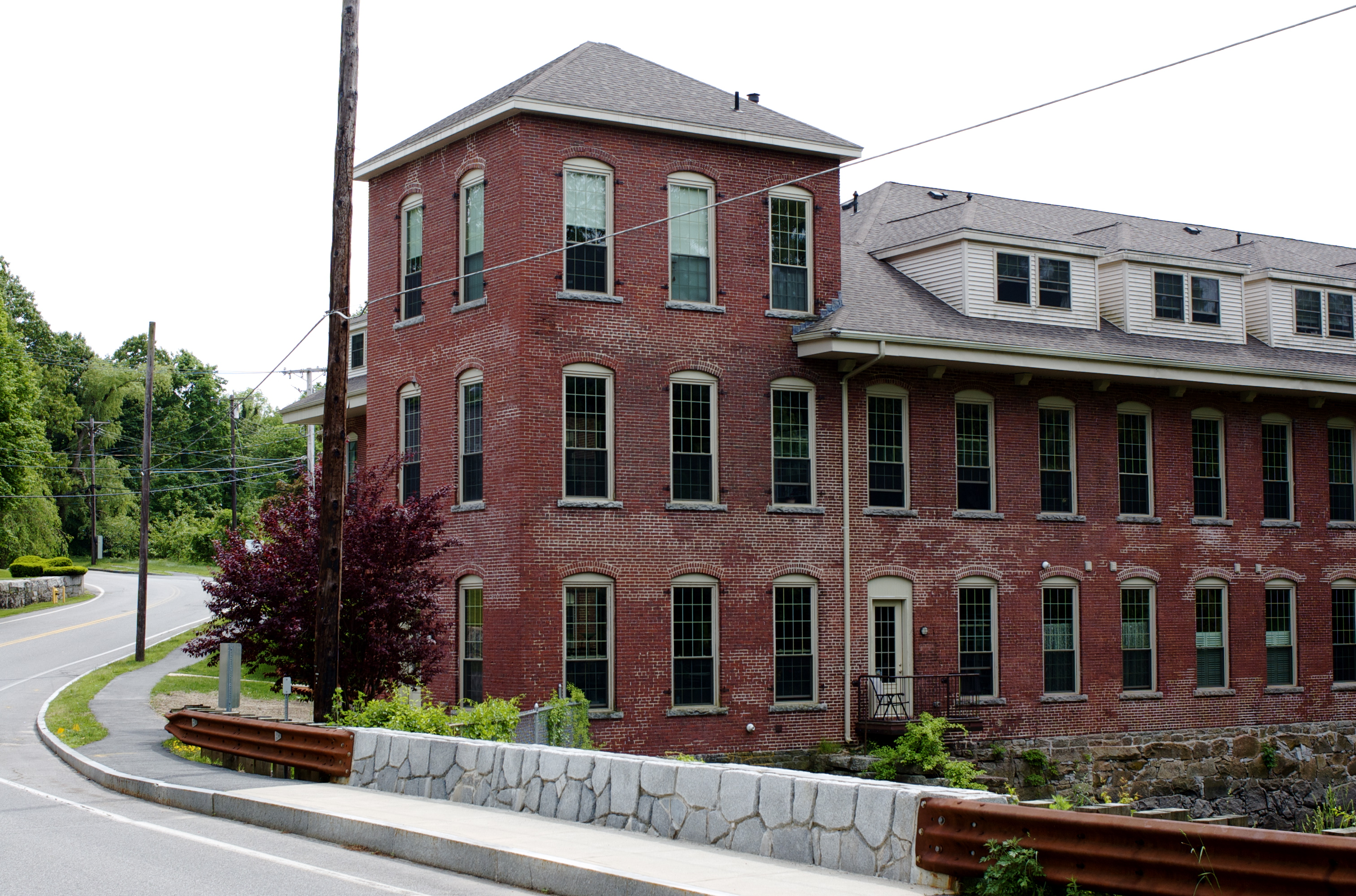
- The Brookside Mill

- Location within Massachusetts Location within the United States
- Location: Westford, Massachusetts
- Coordinates: 42°36′36″N 71°24′42″W
- Area: 25 acres (10 ha)
- Built: 1894
- Architect: Edwards, William C.; Cox, William H.
- Architectural style: Colonial, Greek Revival
- NRHP reference No.: 02001729
- Added to NRHP: January 23, 2003

The Brookside Historic District of Westford, Massachusetts encompasses surviving elements of the 19th century Brookside mill village, the smallest of the town's three 19th-century industrial villages. Developed between about 1860 and 1904, it includes surviving mill buildings and a variety of mill-related worker housing. The district was listed on the National Register of Historic Places in 2003.

== Description and history ==
Brookside Village is centered on Brookside Road, running from Lowell Street to Coolidge Avenue, and includes adjacent properties on Coolidge Avenue and Moore Road. The main structure in the district is the old Brookside Woolen Company mill building, a two-story masonry structure built in 1862 and enlarged in 1894. The mill took its power from Stony Brook, which runs across the southern part of the district. The other principal non-residential structures are the dam across the brook, and a social club at 11 Brookside Road, an English Revival structure built in 1920 as a dining hall for the mill's employees. The rest of the district represents worker housing, most of which was built in the later decades of the 19th century, and are largely in vernacular styles of the period.

The current mill building stands on the site of the first documented fulling mill in Westford, which was built about 1725. Mills were also recorded on the site on an 1831 map, as was a bridge across the brook. In the late 1850s Theodore Hamblett, owner of a sawmill and gristmill at Depot Street, began purchasing properties in the area, including the existing mills. In 1862 he sold the mills to George and Seth Moore, who transformed the property into a woolen mill operation, erecting the oldest surviving portion of the mill that year. The mill owners did not at first build very much worker housing, as sufficient housing was typically built by others in the area. It was not until about 1895 that the company began building housing in significant numbers. The mills declined during the Great Depression, and were closed by 1945. Mill ownership divested itself of the area housing stock by the mid-1950s.

== See also ==
- National Register of Historic Places listings in Middlesex County, Massachusetts
