= Tiverton (CDP), Rhode Island =

Census-designated place in Rhode Island, United States

Tiverton
- CDP
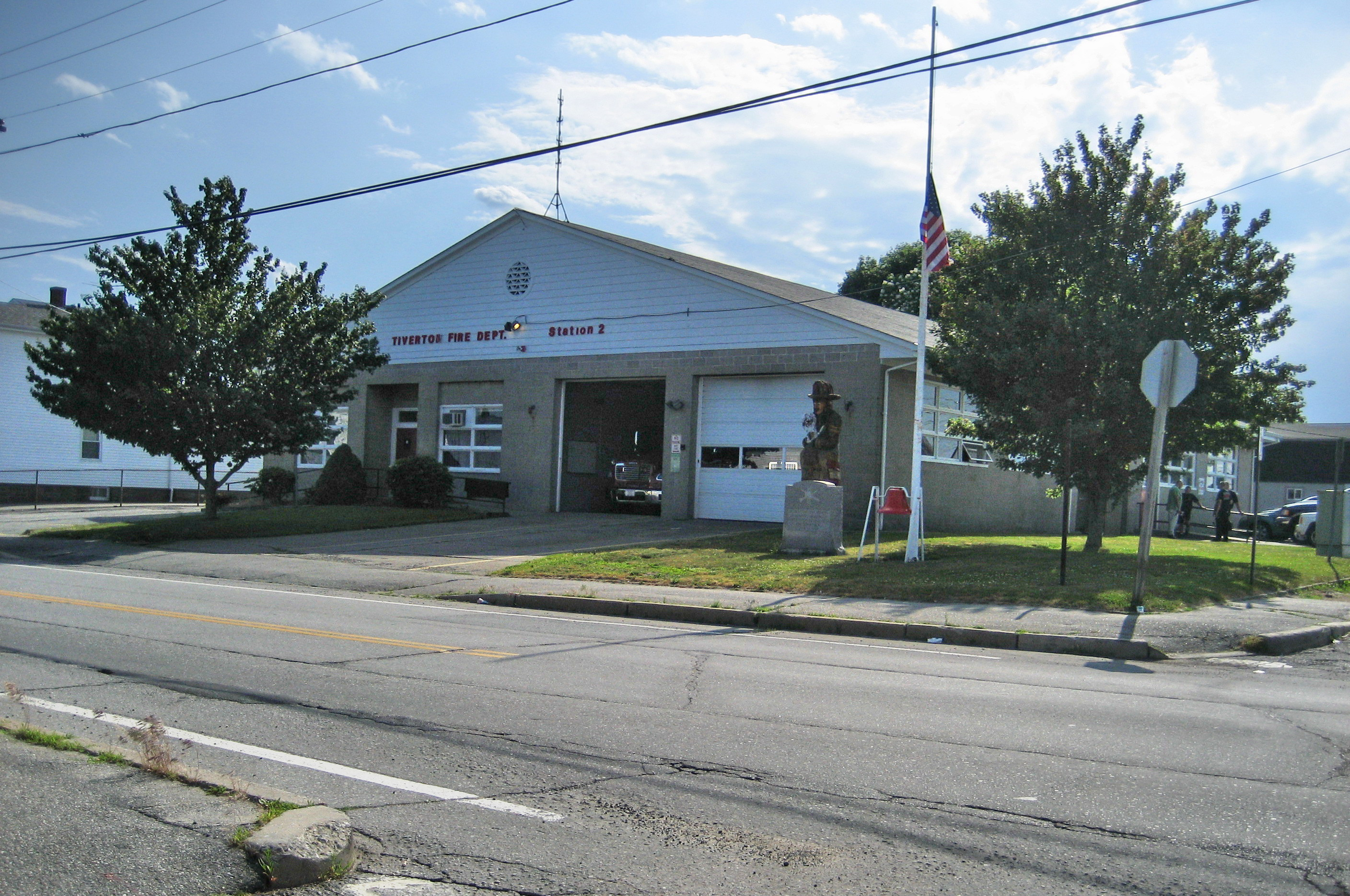
- Fire station in North Tiverton

- Location within the state of Rhode Island
- Coordinates: 41°39′15″N 71°12′1″W
- Country: United States
- State: Rhode Island
- County: Newport

Area
  - Total: 6.62 sq mi (17.15 km^{2})
  - Land: 4.18 sq mi (10.82 km^{2})
  - Water: 2.44 sq mi (6.33 km^{2})
- Elevation: 223 ft (68 m)

Population (2020)
  - Total: 7,809
  - Density: 1,868/sq mi (721.4/km^{2})
- Time zone: UTC-5 (Eastern (EST))
  - Summer (DST): UTC-4 (EDT)
- ZIP code: 02878
- Area code: 401
- FIPS code: 44-70700
- GNIS feature ID: 2378114

Tiverton is a census-designated place (CDP) in Newport County, Rhode Island, United States. The CDP encompasses the town center of Tiverton and the adjacent village of North Tiverton. The population of the CDP was 7,557 at the 2010 census.

== Geography ==
Tiverton is located at 41°39′15″N 71°12′1″W.

According to the United States Census Bureau, the CDP has a total area of 6.6 square miles (17 km^{2}), of which 4.2 square miles (11 km^{2}) is land and 2.4 square miles (6.2 km^{2}), or 36.63%, is water.

== Culture and recreation ==
=== Soccer ===
During the 1920s and early 1930s North Tiverton was effectively the home of Fall River F.C., one of the era's most successful soccer teams. They played their home games at Mark's Stadium, which was based in the community. The stadium is also one of the earliest examples of a soccer-specific stadium in the United States.

== Demographics ==
Historical population
Census	Pop.	Note	%±
2020	7,809		—
U.S. Decennial Census

=== 2020 census ===
The 2020 United States census counted 7,809 people, 3,463 households, and 2,257 families in Tiverton. The population density was 1,868.6 inhabitants per square mile (721.5/km^{2}). There were 3,779 housing units at an average density of 904.3 units per square mile (349.2 units/km^{2}). The racial makeup was 91.27% (7,127) white or European American (90.6% non-Hispanic white), 1.18% (92) black or African-American, 0.12% (9) Native American or Alaska Native, 1.31% (102) Asian, 0.05% (4) Pacific Islander or Native Hawaiian, 1.14% (89) from other races, and 4.94% (386) from two or more races. Hispanic or Latino of any race was 3.2% (250) of the population.

Of the 3,463 households, 22.4% had children under the age of 18; 46.1% were married couples living together; 27.1% had a female householder with no spouse or partner present. 31.4% of households consisted of individuals and 15.6% had someone living alone who was 65 years of age or older. The average household size was 2.4 and the average family size was 2.8. The percent of those with a bachelor's degree or higher was estimated to be 26.3% of the population.

16.4% of the population was under the age of 18, 6.0% from 18 to 24, 22.1% from 25 to 44, 30.4% from 45 to 64, and 25.2% who were 65 years of age or older. The median age was 49.8 years. For every 100 females, the population had 109.6 males. For every 100 females ages 18 and older, there were 110.6 males.

The 2016–2020 5-year American Community Survey estimates show that the median household income was $75,887 (with a margin of error of +/- $5,138) and the median family income was $82,438 (+/- $16,492). Males had a median income of $41,920 (+/- $1,449) versus $38,173 (+/- $6,665) for females. The median income for those above 16 years old was $41,272 (+/- $820). Approximately, 3.9% of families and 6.6% of the population were below the poverty line, including 6.9% of those under the age of 18 and 4.4% of those ages 65 or over.

=== 2000 census ===
As of the census of 2000, there were 7,282 people, 3,044 households, and 2,088 families residing in the CDP. The population density was 1,747.5 inhabitants per square mile (674.7/km^{2}). There were 3,199 housing units at an average density of 767.7 units per square mile (296.4 units/km^{2}). The racial makeup of the CDP was 97.79% White, 0.37% Black or African American, 0.21% Native American, 0.49% Asian, 0.07% Pacific Islander, 0.26% from other races, and 0.81% from two or more races. Hispanic or Latino of any race were 0.99% of the population.

There were 3,044 households, out of which 26.0% had children under the age of 18 living with them, 55.5% were married couples living together, 9.5% had a female householder with no husband present, and 31.4% were non-families. 27.1% of all households were made up of individuals, and 15.1% had someone living alone who was 65 years of age or older. The average household size was 2.39 and the average family size was 2.90.

In the CDP, the population was spread out, with 20.3% under the age of 18, 5.7% from 18 to 24, 28.3% from 25 to 44, 25.4% from 45 to 64, and 20.4% who were 65 years of age or older. The median age was 42 years. For every 100 females, there were 91.9 males. For every 100 females age 18 and over, there were 89.3 males.

The median income for a household in the CDP was $45,683, and the median income for a family was $57,375. Males had a median income of $39,786 versus $28,256 for females. The per capita income for the CDP was $22,238. About 3.7% of families and 5.1% of the population were below the poverty line, including 2.9% of those under age 18 and 12.2% of those age 65 or over.
