= Goodyear F.C. =

- Full name: Goodyear Tire and Rubber Company Football Club
- Nickname: Goodyear
- Founded: 1977
- Ground: Lord Lurgan Memorial Park (Alenhill Park)
- Manager: Dee Connolly
- League: Mid-Ulster Football League

Goodyear Football Club, referred to simply as Goodyear, is an intermediate-level football club playing in Division 2 of the Mid-Ulster Football League in Northern Ireland. Goodyear was founded in 1977 as a work's team by the Goodyear factory workers in Lurgan, County Armagh under the Goodyear Tire and Rubber Company. The factory itself opened in 1967 but would close in July 1983. Despite this, the club has continued to play in the Mid-Ulster Football League. The club also have a reserves team, who play in the Mid-Ulster Football Reserves League. Goodyear compete in the Irish Cup. They are a part of the Mid-Ulster Football Association.

== Goodyear Club identity and ground ==
The club's identify is based around the Goodyear Tire and Rubber Company, with the Goodyear logo being the main part of the club badge with "FC" featuring. They also play in blue and yellow, the colours associated with Goodyear. The club play their home games at Lord Lurgan Memorial Park (Alenhill Park) The current manager of the club is Dee Connolly.

== History ==
The Goodyear factory in Lurgan opened in 1967 to make hoses, fan belts, conveyor belts, and other rubber products. The factory provided much-needed jobs in the town of Lurgan and surrounding areas in Craigavon. It is often lauded as Craigavon's industrial revolution. A railway station named "Goodyear" to serve the factory opened in August 1970. When the closure of the Goodyear factory was announced in 1982, the Goodyear Sports & Social Club would open to serve the community, including the former factory workers of Goodyear. The Goodyear factory would officially close in 1983. It hosted functions for the football team and community, had a club bar and bar games like pool and darts.

In the 2021/22 season, the Anton Dummington led the team to the Foster Cup, having been with the club for over 15 years as manager and player. They just missed out on the Division 2 title late into the season, and reached the quarter-finals of the NI Junior Cup.

Two of the club's founder members were Noel Bibb and Tony Moore, who were later memorialised in a local football cup and shield competition. These tournaments are known as the Noel Bibb Cup and Tony Moore Shield. Tony Moore was the chairman and died in April 2020. Noel Bibb died in May of that year.

The Goodyear Sports and Social Club announced its closure in 2024 after the annual committee meeting agreed it was no longer feasible. The complex closed its doors for the last time in June 2024. Goodyear Football Club continued to operate as normal in the 2024/25 season.

== Honours ==
Mid-Ulster Football League

- Division 3
  - 2000/01, 2003/04
- Foster Cup
  - 2021/22
- Beckett Cup
  - 2000/01, 2003/04
- Division 3 Cup
  - 1985
