= Shawsheen Indians =

United States soccer club

Shawsheen Indians were a United States soccer club based in Andover, Massachusetts during the early 1920s.

== History ==
The Shawsheen Football Club, known by its nickname The Indians, was founded by George Park and played in the New Bedford Industrial Soccer League in the early 1920s. In 1924, Park left the team and George Wallace, private secretary to William Wood owner of the American Woolen Company, took over management of the team. He had a vision of taking the Indians to the top of the U.S. soccer world. To realize that dream, he convinced Mr. Wood to sponsor the team and fund the building of a state of the art soccer stadium, Balmoral Park. Wallace then recruited several Scottish league players to move to the United States. In 1924, the Indians entered the Massachusetts State Cup for the first time, easily disposing of the competition, including a 3-0 victory over the Holyoke Falcos in the final. In the fall of 1924, Shawsheen entered a semi-professional New England league known as the National League. The Indians won the 1924-1925 league title. It also entered the 1925 National Challenge Cup, the first time the Indians had entered the Challenge Cup. Despite their novice status, they ran away with the championship, defeating the Chicago Canadian Club 3-0 in the April 14, 1925 final at Mark's Stadium. Wallace had attained his goal of taking his team to the top. The only step remaining was to turn fully professional and compete with the best teams in the region on a weekly basis. To do this, he entered the Indians in the professional American Soccer League for the 1925-1926 season. Using a revamped lineup, including several players on loan from the Fall River F.C., the Indians began the season well. However, William Wood died early in the season and his successors ended the American Woolen Company's sponsorship of the Indians. Attendance alone was unable to pay for the team's expenses and it was forced into banckruptcy, withdrew from the ASL at the end of March 1926 and ceased operations.

== Year-by-year ==
| Season | Div. | League | | | National cup |
| Season | Div. | Assoc. | Posit. | Playoffs | National cup |
|---|---|---|---|---|---|
| 1923–24 | N/A | Industrial League | ? | No playoff | Did not participate |
| 1924–25 | 2 | National League | 1st | No playoff | Champions |
| 1925–26 | 1 | ASL | 10th | No playoff | First round |

== Honors ==
- National Challenge Cup

- Winners 1925: 1

- Massachusetts State Cup

- Winners 1924: 1
