= Abbot Worsted =

American soccer team

Abbot Worsted Company was at one time the largest producer of carpet yarns in the world.

Abbot Worsted had an early twentieth century U.S. soccer team sponsored by the Abbot Worsted Yarn Company of Forge Village, Massachusetts. During the early 1920s, it was a perennial contender in the National Challenge Cup.

== History ==
The Abbot Worsted Company was founded in 1855, but in 1879, it established facilities in Forge Village, Massachusetts. By 1916, it was the largest producer of carpet yarns in the world, drawing a work force from both the local population and Britain. Abbot Worsted F.C. was the company's team. In 1919, it was drawn with Lynn Hibernians in the first round of the 1920 National Challenge Cup. Abbot Worsted beat the Lynn Hibernians 3-2. In 1921, the team hired Jack Kershaw who had scored a goal for the losing Fore River in the 1920 National Challenge Cup, as head coach. Over the next six years, Kershaw took the Forge Villagers, as the team was known, deep into the Challenge Cup. In both 1922 and 1925, Abbot Worsted went to the cup semifinals. In 1923 and 1924, they made it to the quarterfinals. In addition, in 1924, Worsted lost in the semifinals of the American Cup. The Forge Villagers also went to the 1921 and 1922 Massachusetts State Cup, but lost both times, to Fore River in 1921 and to Holyoke Falcos in 1922. After Kershaw left to coach Harvard in 1927, Abbott Worsted F.C. faded from the national scene.

== Honors ==
Massachusetts State Cup

- Runner Up (2): 1921, 1922
