= Jeannette Athletic Association F.C. =

Jeanette Athletic Association F.C. was an early twentieth century amateur U.S. soccer team from Pittsburgh, Pennsylvania which had a brief period of national success. In 1923, it won the Pittsburgh Press Soccer League championship and went to the quarterfinals of the 1923 National Challenge Cup and the third round of the 1925 National Challenge Cup.

This club should not be confused with Jeanette F.C. (one “n”) from Michigan which played during the same period.
