= Chicago Canadian Club =

Chicago Canadian Club was a U.S. soccer team from the early twentieth century. In 1923, it played in the Chicago Major Soccer League. In 1925, it finished runner up to the Shawsheen Indians in the National Challenge Cup and in 1926, it was eliminated from the National Challenge Cup in the semifinals.
