= 1925–26 American Soccer League =

American Soccer League -1924–25 Season-
- Season: 1924–25
- Champions: Fall River F.C. (3rd title)
- Lewis Cup: New Bedford Whalers
- Top goalscorer: Andy Stevens (44)

Statistics of American Soccer League in season 1925–26.

== Overview ==
In June 1925, the league admitted the Shawsheen Indians, winners of the 1924–25 National Challenge Cup. The team was owned by William Madison Wood who also owned the American Woolen Company. The team began on a high note, goings 10-4-1 through its first fifteen games. However, in mid-December it experienced a reversal of form, going 1-10-2. When Wood died in February, the team withdrew from the league and disbanded.

Beginning on September 12, 1925, the American Soccer League began a forty-four game schedule which ended on May 31, 1926. The league introduced an innovation this season. Previously winners were selected on cumulative points. With many teams not completing all their scheduled games, the league adopted an approach similar to professional baseball which used a win percentage to determine its champions. However, rather than calculating a win-lose percentage, the American Soccer League calculated the percentage of points won versus the number of points available.

== League standings ==
Place	Team	GP	W	D	L	GF	GA	Pts	Pct
1	Fall River F.C.	44	30	12	2	143	52	72	.819
2	New Bedford Whalers	44	28	5	11	119	70	61	.693
3	Boston	42	23	7	13	100	65	53	.634
4	Bethlehem Steel	35	23	6	12	115	58	52	.616
5	Providence	39	21	5	13	90	62	47	.602
6	Indiana Flooring	42	18	6	18	83	81	42	.500
7	Brooklyn Wanderers	40	16	7	17	76	71	39	.487
8	J & P Coats	40	15	7	17	76	91	37	.474
9	New York Giants	37	13	6	18	76	90	32	.432
10	Shawsheen Indians (Note: Shawsheen withdrew after 29 games (11-3-15). Their remaining fifteen games were counted as forfeits and their scheduled opponents received one point each. Forfeited games: Bethlehem Steel (2); Brooklyn (2); Indiana (1); J&P Coats (2); Newark (2); New Bedford (1); New York (2); Philadelphia (2); Providence (1))	44	11	3	30	33	89	25	.284
11	Philadelphia (Note: Philadelphia forfeited 3 games: Bethlehem (1); Boston (1); Indiana (1))	44	8	3	33	41	150	19	.215
12	Newark Skeeters	38	5	6	27	30	124	15	.202

== Lewis Cup ==
The American Soccer League ran its second league cup during the season. The winners were awarded the H.E. Lewis Cup.

=== Bracket ===
May 16–17; 2-legged aggregate
MA	New Bedford Whalers	6	2	8
RI	Providence	0	4	4
NY	New York Giants	0	9	9
PA	Bethlehem Steel	2	3	5

May 22–23; 2-legged aggregate
MA	New Bedford Whalers	5	0	5
NY	New York Giants	1	3	4

=== Final ===
May 22, 1926

New Bedford Whalers	5–1	New York Giants
Andrew Burnett 8' (o.g.); Neil Turner 14'; Robert Hosie 22' (o.g.); Neil Turner; Andy Stevens		Charlie Kelly (pen.)

New Bedford, Massachusetts
Referee: Mose Bloom

May 23, 1926

New York Giants	3–0	New Bedford Whalers (MA)
Cecil Bremner; Davey Brown 65'; Tommy Duggan 70'

The Oval, New York, New York
Referee: Mose Bloom

New Bedford wins Lewis Cup, 5–4, on aggregate.

== Goals leaders ==
Rank	Scorer	Club	Games	Goals
1	Andy Stevens	New Bedford Whalers	39	44
2	Archie Stark	Bethlehem Steel	37	43
3	Bobby Blair	Boston Soccer Club	33	36
4	Tec White	Fall River F.C.	39	33
5	John Nelson	Brooklyn Wanderers	27	30
6	Davey Brown	New York Giants	26	28
7	Bart McGhee	Indiana Flooring	38	25
8	Tommy Florie	Providence F.C.	38	22
9	Jim Purvis	Bethlehem Steel	22	21
9	Harold Brittan	Fall River F.C.	32	21
9	Mike McLeavy	New Bedford Whalers	35	21
12	Tucker Croft	Fall River F.C.	31	19
12	Herbert Carlsson	Indiana Flooring	36	19
12	Dougie Campbell	Fall River F.C.	41	19
15	Billy Adam	J&P Coats	30	18
15	Jerry Best	New Bedford Whalers	41	18
17	Frank McKenna	Fall River F.C.	34	16
18	Bob Millar	Indiana Flooring	28	15
19	Billy Hogg	Providence F.C.	23	14
19	Neil Turner	New Bedford Whalers	32	14
21	Bobby Curtis	Providence F.C.	30	13
22	Barney Battles, Jr.	Boston Soccer Club	20	12
23	Jack Renfrew	Providence F.C.	26	11
23	Andy Straden	Shawsheen Indians	31	11
23	Malcolm Goldie	Bethlehem Steel	31	11
23	Alec Lorimer	Shawsheen Indians	33	11
27	Bill Westwater	Boston Soccer Club	20	10
27	Johnny Reid	Fall River F.C.	21	10
27	Bobby Drummond	J&P Coats	20	10
27	Johnny Ballantyne	Boston Soccer Club	21	10
