= 1923–24 Bethlehem Steel F.C. season =

Bethlehem Steel F.C.
1923-24 season
- Stadium: Bethlehem Steel Athletic Field
- American Soccer League: Runners-up
- National Challenge Cup: Final; Eastern Division
- American Cup: Winners
- Top goalscorer: Alex Jackson (14)
- Biggest win: 7 goals 7-0 vs. Kaywood Catholic F.C. (20 October 1923); 7-0 at Fairhill F.C. (10 November 1923)
- Biggest defeat: 3 goals 0-3 vs. Fall River F.C. (17 May 1923)

The 1923–24 Bethlehem Steel F.C. season was the third season for the club in the American Soccer League. The club finished the season in 2nd place but won the American Cup.

== American Soccer League ==
Date	Opponents	H/A	Result F–A	Scorers	Attendance
7 October 1923	Brooklyn Wanderers F.C.	A	1-1	Goldie	2,000
13 October 1923	New York S.C.	H	4-3	A. Jackson, Maxwell, Goldie, Grainger	
14 October 1923	New York S.C.	A	2-4	A. Jackson, W. Jackson	
21 October 1923	National Giants F.C.	A	2-2	A. Jackson, W. Jackson	
3 November 1923	National Giants F.C.	H	5-1	A. Jackson, W. Jackson, Goldie, Grainger (2)	
12 November 1923	Philadelphia F.C.	H	1-0	Rattray	
8 December 1923	Newark F.C.	H	2-0	W. Jackson (2)	
9 December 1923	Newark F.C.	A	4-3	Turner, W. Jackson (2), Goldie	
15 December 1923	Fall River F.C.	H	1-0	Turner	
22 December 1923	J. & P. Coats F.C.	H	6-0	A. Jackson (2), W. Jackson (2), Goldie, Maxwell	
5 January 1924	J. & P. Coats F.C.	A	1-0	Turner	
6 January 1924	Fall River F.C.	A	0-1		
12 January 1924	Brooklyn Wanderers F.C.	H	3-0	A. Jackson, Rattray (2)	
19 January 1924	National Giants F.C.	H	3-1	A. Jackson, Rattray, Turner	
10 February 1924	Brooklyn Wanderers F.C.	H	2-1	A. Jackson, Turner	
16 February 1924	Philadelphia F.C.	A	2-1	A. Jackson, Goldie	
1 March 1924	Newark F.C.	H	3-0	A. Jackson (2), Grainger	
15 March 1924	J. & P. Coats F.C.	H	1-1	W. Jackson	
29 March 1924	J. & P. Coats F.C.	A	2-3	Grainger (2)	
30 March 1924	National Giants F.C.	A	1-1	Goldie	
12 April 1924	Philadelphia F.C.	H	4-0	W. Jackson (2), Maxwell, Goldie	
26 April 1924	New York S.C.	H	0-1		
4 May 1924	Brooklyn Wanderers F.C.	A	1-2	Robertson	
17 May 1924	Fall River F.C.	H	0-3		
25 May 1924	Newark F.C.	A	4-2	A. Jackson, Goldie, Grainger, McGregor	
30 May 1924	Philadelphia F.C.	H	2-0	Grainger, A. Jackson	
31 May 1924	Fall River F.C.	A	2-1	W. Jackson, own goal	
8 June 1924	New York S.C.	A	4-1	A. Jackson, Turner, Maxwell, McGregor	

Pos	Club	Pld	W	D	L	GF	GA	GD	Pts
1	Fall River F.C.	27	19	6	2	59	19	+40	44
2	Bethlehem Steel F.C.	28	18	4	6	63	33	+30	40
3	New York S.C.	28	15	8	5	67	39	+28	38
4	J. & P. Coats F.C.	25	11	5	9	59	54	+5	27
5	Brooklyn Wanderers F.C.	27	9	5	13	47	57	-10	23
6	National Giants F.C.	26	6	6	14	36	64	-28	18
7	Philadelphia F.C.	26	5	3	18	30	64	-34	13
8	Newark F.C.	23	3	1	19	20	53	-33	7

Pld = Matches played; W = Matches won; D = Matches drawn; L = Matches lost; GF = Goals for; GA = Goals against; Pts = Points

== National Challenge Cup ==
Date	Round	Opponents	H/A	Result F–A	Scorers	Attendance
20 October 1923	First Round; Eastern Division	Kaywood Catholic F.C.	H	7-0	A. Jackson, W. Jackson (3), Grainger (3)	
10 November 1923	Second Round; Eastern Division	Fairhill F.C.	A	7-0	A. Jackson (2), W. Jackson (2), Maxwell, Grainger	
1 December 1923	Third Round; Eastern Division; Philadelphia District	Philadelphia F.C.	H	5-0	A. Jackson (2), W. Jackson (3)	
25 December 1923	Fourth Round; Eastern Division	New York S.C.	H	1-1 (aet)	W. Jackson (2)	
30 December 1923	Fourth Round; Eastern Division (replay)	New York S.C.	A	4-3	W. Jackson (3), Maxwell	6,000
26 January 1924	Semifinals; Eastern Division	Newark F.C.	at National League Park	1-1 (aet)	A. Jackson	
2 February 1924	Semifinals; Eastern Division (replay)	Newark F.C.	at National League Park	4-0	A. Jackson (2), W. Jackson (2)	
9 March 1924	Final; Eastern Division	Fall River F.C.	at Dexter Park	0-2		

== American Football Association Cup ==
Date	Round	Opponents	H/A	Result F–A	Scorers	Attendance
24 November 1923	Second Round	Philadelphia F.C.	A	2-1	A. Jackson, W. Jackson	
13 January 1924	Third Round	Bedford F.C.	at New York Oval	6-1	A. Jackson (3), W. Jackson, Maxwell, McGregor	
22 March 1924	Fourth Round	Fleisher Yarn F.C.	A	3-1	W. Jackson (2), Grainger	
20 April 1924	Semifinals	New York S.C.	A	1-0	W. Jackson	
11 May 1924	Final	Fall River F.C.	at West Side Park	1-0	Rattray	

== Exhibitions ==
Date	Opponents	H/A	Result F–A	Scorers	Attendance
30 September 1923	Fall River F.C.	A	1-1		
28 October 1923	Wolfenden Shore F.C.	A	3-1	Carnihan, W. Jackson (2)	
3 February 1924	Trenton Seniors	A	1-0		
5 April 1924	All St. Louis	A	3-2	Maxwell, A. Jackson (2)	
6 April 1924	All St. Louis	A	2-1	Maxwell, W. Jackson	
7 April 1924	Gillespie F.C.	A	4-0		

== Notes and references ==
Bibliography

- Jose, Colin (1998). The American Soccer League: The Golden Years of American Soccer 1921-1931. Lanham, Maryland: Scarecrow Press. ISBN 978-0810834293.
- Cahill, Thomas W., ed. (1923). Spalding's Official "Soccer" Football Guide 1923-24. Spalding's "Red Cover" Series of Athletic Handbooks, No. 55R. New York: American Sports Publishing Company.

Footnotes
