= 1924–25 American Soccer League =

American Soccer League -1924–25 Season-
- Season: 1924–25
- Champions: Fall River F.C. (2nd title)
- League Cup: Boston
- Top goalscorer: Archie Stark (67)

Statistics of American Soccer League in season 1924–25.

== League standings ==
Place	Team	GP	W	D	L	GF	GA	Pts
1	Fall River F.C.	44	27	12	5	113	38	66
2	Bethlehem Steel	44	29	5	10	127	53	63
3	Brooklyn Wanderers	44	22	8	14	68	56	52
4	Boston S.C.	41	22	7	12	75	53	51
5	New Bedford Whalers	41	21	7	13	69	55	49
6	Providence F.C.	42	18	11	13	85	59	47
7	J & P Coats	42	19	5	18	89	76	43
8	New York Giants	43	16	6	21	78	84	38
9	Indiana Flooring	43	16	6	21	68	69	38
10	Fleisher Yarn	39	11	6	22	68	114	28
11	Newark Skeeters	39	8	3	28	39	104	19
12	Philadelphia F.C.	42	2	6	34	27	146	8

== League Cup ==
In August 1924, the American Soccer League, along with the St. Louis Soccer League, withdrew from the National Challenge Cup. In November 1924, the St. Louis Soccer League executives suggested the two leagues create a replacement tournament open only to teams from the ASL and SLSL. The ASL eventually decided to run a league cup. The winner of that cup would then meet the champion of the St. Louis Soccer League for the title of the American professional soccer champion. In this, its first season, the league ran the cup as a single elimination tournament concurrent with the league schedule. The winners of the final were awarded the H.E. Lewis Cup which had previously been awarded to the Blue Mountain League champions from 1915 to 1919. Boston took the league cup and then defeated Ben Millers in the American Professional Soccer League championship.

=== Bracket ===
March 7–15
MA	Fall River F.C.	3
MA	New Bedford Whalers	0
PA	Fleisher Yarn	0
MA	Boston	1

March 29
MA	Fall River F.C.	1
MA	Boston	2

=== Final ===
March 29, 1925

Fall River F.C.	1–2	Boston
Tucker Croft	Report	2' Andy Stevens; 86' Alex McNab

Mark's Stadium, Tiverton, Rhode Island
Attendance: 17,000
Referee: Danny Oates

== Goals leaders ==
Rank	Scorer	Club	Games	Goals
1	Archie Stark	Bethlehem Steel	44	67
2	Andy Stevens	New Bedford Whalers	32	33
3	Harold Brittan	Fall River F.C.	34	32
4	Davey Brown	New York Field Club	34	26
5	John Nelson	Brooklyn Wanderers	33	24
5	Herbert Carlsson	Indiana Flooring	40	24
7	Jerry Best	Providence F.C.	29	20
7	Andy Straden	Fleisher Yarn	34	20
9	Bobby Drummond	J&P Coats	42	18
10	Jim Purvis	Fleisher Yarn	35	17
11	Tewfik Abdallah	Providence F.C.	34	15
11	Tommy Fleming	Boston Soccer Club	40	15
13	Billy Hibbert	J&P Coats	28	14
13	Tucker Croft	Fall River F.C.	30	14
13	Harry McGowan	Fall River F.C.	35	14
13	Billy Hogg	Brooklyn Wanderers	40	14
17	Bill McPherson	Fall River F.C.	38	13
17	Caleb Schylander	Indiana Flooring	43	13
19	Bill Westwater	New Bedford Whalers	17	12
19	Neil Turner	Bethlehem Steel	23	12
19	Johnny Ballantyne	Boston Soccer Club	40	12
22	Johnny Rollo	Bethlehem Steel	30	11
22	Tommy Florie	Providence F.C.	33	11
22	McLaughlin	Fleisher Yarn	34	11
25	John Heminsley	J&P Coats	28	10
25	Jimmy McGhee	Fleisher Yarn	31	10
25	Dougie Campbell	Fall River F.C.	35	10
25	Bob Perry	J&P Coats	36	10
