= 1923–24 Brooklyn Wanderers F.C. season =

Brooklyn Wanderers F.C.
1923-24 season
- Owner: Nat Agar
- Manager: Nat Agar
- Stadium: Wanderers' Stadium
- American Soccer League: 5th
- National Challenge Cup: Third Round; Eastern Division; Southern New York and Connecticut
- American Cup: Third Round
- Southern New York State Football Association Cup: Runners-up
- Top goalscorer: Billy Hogg (12)
- Biggest win: 7 goals 7-0 vs. J. & P. Coats F.C. (27 January 1924)
- Biggest defeat: 5 goals 1-6 at New York S.C. (1 June 1924)

The 1923–24 Brooklyn Wanderers F.C. season was the second season for the club in the American Soccer League. The club finished the season in 5th place but won the Southern New York Football Association Cup.

== American Soccer League ==
Date	Opponents	H/A	Result F–A	Scorers	Attendance
7 October 1923	Bethlehem Steel F.C.	H	1-1	Doherty	2,000
14 October 1923	Newark F.C.	H	2-1	Hogg, Doherty	
28 October 1923	Philadelphia F.C.	H	1-0	Hogg	
3 November 1923	J. & P. Coats F.C.	A	1-2	Curtis	
4 November 1923	Fall River F.C.	A	1-1	Forrest	
18 November 1923	Philadelphia F.C.	H	4-0 (Note: Brooklyn was allowed to substitute an injured player which was against the rules at the time; league ordered the game replayed on January 13.)	Curtis, Nicol (2), Hogg	1,500
25 November 1923	J. & P. Coats F.C.	H	3-2	Robertson, Hogg, Curtis	
9 December 1923	Fall River F.C.	A	2-3	Nicol, Hogg	
16 December 1923	Fall River F.C.	H	1-1	Nicol	
23 December 1923	National Giants F.C.	H	2-2	Hogg (2)	
1 January 1924	Philadelphia F.C.	A	0-4		
6 January 1924	Newark F.C.	A	0-4		
12 January 1924	Bethlehem Steel F.C.	H	0-3		
13 January 1924	Philadelphia F.C.	H	6-3 (Note: Replay of game played on November 18.)	Hogg (3), Cosgrove, Curtis (2)	
27 January 1924	J. & P. Coats F.C.	H	7-0	Robertson, Hogg, Cosgrove (3), Curtis (2)	
10 February 1924	Bethlehem Steel F.C.	A	1-2	Nicol	
17 February 1924	New York S.C.	H	3-4	Cosgrove, P. Hardy (2)	
22 February 1924	Newark F.C.	H	cancelled (Note: Game cancelled due to condition of grounds.)		
2 March 1924	Fall River F.C.	A	0-1		
8 March 1924	Philadelphia F.C.	A	4-3	Hogg, Cosgrove (2), Curtis	
16 March 1924	National Giants F.C.	H	1-0	Cosgrove	2,000
23 March 1924	Newark F.C.	A	0-1		
30 March 1924	New York S.C.	H	1-1	P. Hardy	3,000
6 April 1924	New York S.C.	A	1-3	Robertson	
13 April 1924	National Giants F.C.	A	2-4	Forrest, Hogg	5,000
26 April 1924	J. & P. Coats F.C.	A	2-3	Nicol, Yule	
4 May 1924	Bethlehem Steel F.C.	H	2-1	Cosgrove, Curtis	
18 May 1924	National Giants F.C.	A	2-0	Nicol, Nelson	
1 June 1924	New York S.C.	A	1-6	Nicol	

Pos	Club	Pld	W	D	L	GF	GA	GD	Pts
1	Fall River F.C.	27	19	6	2	59	19	+40	44
2	Bethlehem Steel F.C.	28	18	4	6	63	33	+30	40
3	New York S.C.	28	15	8	5	67	39	+28	38
4	J. & P. Coats F.C.	25	11	5	9	59	54	+5	27
5	Brooklyn Wanderers F.C.	27	9	5	13	47	57	-10	23
6	National Giants F.C.	26	6	6	14	36	64	-28	18
7	Philadelphia F.C.	26	5	3	18	30	64	-34	13
8	Newark F.C.	23	3	1	19	20	53	-33	7

Pld = Matches played; W = Matches won; D = Matches drawn; L = Matches lost; GF = Goals for; GA = Goals against; Pts = Points

== National Challenge Cup ==
Date	Round	Opponents	H/A	Result F–A	Scorers	Attendance
21 October 1923	First Round; Eastern Division; Southern New York District	Emerald-Celtic F.C.	H	3-0	Hogg, Doherty, Curtis	
11 November 1923	Second Round; Eastern Division; Southern New York District	Bedford F.C.	H	3-0	Doherty (2), Curtis	
3 December 1923	Third Round; Eastern Division; Southern New York and Connecticut District	New York S.C.	H	0-1		6,000

== American Football Association Cup ==
Date	Round	Opponents	H/A	Result F–A	Scorers	Attendance
20 November 1923	Second Round	Newark F.C.	H	4-2	Hogg, Cosgrove, Doherty, Curtis	
3 February 1924	Third Round	New York S.C.	A	0-2		

== Southern New York State Football Association Cup ==
Date	Round	Opponents	H/A	Result F–A	Scorers	Attendance
11 May 1924	Fourth Round	Bedford F.C.	H	3-0		1,500
25 May 1924	Semifinals	Indiana Flooring Company F.C.	A	4-0	P. Hardy, Curtis (2), Cosgrove	
22 June 1924	Final	New York S.C.	A	2-3	P. Hardy, Yule	

== Notes and references ==
Bibliography

- Jose, Colin (1998). The American Soccer League: The Golden Years of American Soccer 1921-1931. Lanham, Maryland: Scarecrow Press. ISBN 978-0810834293.
- Cahill, Thomas W., ed. (1923). Spalding's Official "Soccer" Football Guide 1923-24. Spalding's "Red Cover" Series of Athletic Handbooks, No. 55R. New York: American Sports Publishing Company.

Footnotes
