= 1922–23 Bethlehem Steel F.C. season =

Bethlehem Steel F.C.
1922-23 season
- Stadium: Bethlehem Steel Athletic Field
- American Soccer League: Runners-up
- National Challenge Cup: Fourth Round; Eastern Division; New York, New Jersey, Eastern Pennsylvania and Connecticut District
- American Cup: Second Round
- Top goalscorer: Daniel McNiven (28)
- Biggest win: 5 goals 6-1 vs. Fall River F.C. (31 March 1923); 5-0 vs. Philadelphia F.C. (21 April 1923)
- Biggest defeat: 3 goals 1-4 at New York S.C. (24 December 1922)

The 1922–23 Bethlehem Steel F.C. season was the second season for the club in the American Soccer League but its first season in Bethlehem after playing the previous season as Philadelphia F.C. Following the 1921-22 season, the Philadelphia club was transferred "back" to Bethlehem and a new team was organized in Philadelphia to take its place. The club finished the season in 2nd place.

== American Soccer League ==
Date	Opponents	H/A	Result F–A	Scorers	Attendance
7 October 1922	Philadelphia F.C.	A	1-2	Faulds	
22 October 1922	Paterson F.C.	A	2-1	McNiven (2)	
29 October 1922	New York S.C.	A	1-0	Rattray	
19 November 1922	Harrison S.C.	A	3-0	McNiven (2), Campbell	
30 November 1922	Brooklyn Wanderers F.C.	A	1-0	McNiven	
2 December 1922	Harrison S.C.	H	3-0	Faulds (2), McFarlane	
9 December 1922	J. & P. Coats F.C.	A	1-2	Rattray	4,000
10 December 1922	Fall River F.C.	A	0-0		7,000
16 December 1922	Paterson F.C.	H	2-2	Faulds, Easton	
30 December 1922	Brooklyn Wanderers F.C.	H	3-0	McCourt, Easton (2)	
6 January 1923	J. & P. Coats F.C.	H	1-1	McNiven	500
13 January 1923	Paterson F.C.	H	2-1	McNiven, Campbell	
20 January 1923	Fall River F.C.	H	3-2	McNiven (3)	
3 February 1923	New York S.C.	H	3-3	Rattray, Goldie, Campbell	
4 March 1923	New York S.C.	A	1-0	McNiven	
17 March 1923	Philadelphia F.C.	H	5-1	Rattray (2), McNiven (3)	
24 March 1923	New York S.C.	H	2-1	Young, Goldie	
31 March 1923	Fall River F.C.	H	6-1	McNiven (4), Campbell, Maxwell	
2 April 1923	Philadelphia F.C.	A	1-0	McNiven	
7 April 1923	Brooklyn Wanderers F.C.	H	2-0	Rattray, Goldie	
8 April 1923	Brooklyn Wanderers F.C.	A	3-3	Easton (3)	
14 April 1923	J. & P. Coats F.C.	A	0-1		
15 April 1923	Harrison S.C.	A	2-1	Maxwell, McNiven	
19 April 1923	Fall River F.C.	A	1-1	McNiven	5,000
21 April 1923	Philadelphia F.C.	H	5-0	McNiven (4), Goldie	
28 April 1923	Harrison S.C.	H	3-0	McNiven, Goldie, Maxwell	
6 May 1923	Paterson F.C.	A	2-3	McNiven (2)	3,000
2 June 1923	J. & P. Coats F.C.	H	forfeit win (Note: Game forfeited to Bethlehem Steel F.C. at meeting of ASL on 10 June 1923.)		

Pos	Club	Pld	W	D	L	GF	GA	GD	Pts
1	J. & P. Coats F.C.	28	21	2	5	68	30	+38	44
2	Bethlehem Steel F.C.	28	18	6	4	59	26	+33	42
3	Fall River F.C.	28	15	5	8	53	36	+17	35
4	New York S.C.	23	10	4	9	53	42	+11	24
5	Paterson F.C.	20	9	4	7	38	31	+7	22
6	Brooklyn Wanderers F.C.	25	5	5	15	24	52	-28	15
7	Harrison S.C.	23	4	2	17	26	56	-30	10
8	Philadelphia F.C.	25	3	2	20	24	72	-48	8

Pld = Matches played; W = Matches won; D = Matches drawn; L = Matches lost; GF = Goals for; GA = Goals against; Pts = Points

== National Challenge Cup ==
Date	Round	Opponents	H/A	Result F–A	Scorers	Attendance
14 October 1922	First Round; Eastern Division; Eastern Pennsylvania District	Kaywood F.C.	H	4-0	McNiven (3), Faulds	
4 November 1922	Second Round; Eastern Division; Eastern Pennsylvania and Maryland District	Fleisher Yarn F.C.	H	1-0	Forrest	
25 November 1922	Third Round; Eastern Division; New York, New Jersey and Eastern Pennsylvania District	Fairhill F.C.	A	3-0	McNiven (2), Goldie	
24 December 1922	Fourth Round; Eastern Division; New York, New Jersey, Eastern Pennsylvania and Connecticut District	New York S.C.	A	1-4	McNiven	6,000

== American Cup ==
Date	Round	Opponents	H/A	Result F–A	Scorers	Attendance
11 November 1922	Second Round	Fleisher Yarn F.C.	A	2-3	Goldie, Terris	6,000

== Notes and references ==
Bibliography

- Jose, Colin (1998). The American Soccer League: The Golden Years of American Soccer 1921-1931. Lanham, Maryland: Scarecrow Press. ISBN 978-0810834293.
- Cahill, Thomas W., ed. (1922). Spalding's Official "Soccer" Football Guide 1922-23. Spalding's "Red Cover" Series of Athletic Handbooks, No. 55R. New York: American Sports Publishing Company.
- Cahill, Thomas W., ed. (1923). Spalding's Official "Soccer" Football Guide 1923-24. Spalding's "Red Cover" Series of Athletic Handbooks, No. 55R. New York: American Sports Publishing Company.

Footnotes
