= 1923–24 Philadelphia F.C. season =

Philadelphia F.C.
1923-24 season
- Manager: Brooks
- Stadium: National League Park
- American Soccer League: 7th
- National Challenge Cup: Third Round; Eastern Division; Philadelphia District
- American Cup: Second Round
- Top goalscorer: Curran (6)
- Biggest win: 4 goals 4-0 vs. Brooklyn Wanderers F.C. (1 January 1924)
- Biggest defeat: 6 goals 1-7 at J. & P. Coats F.C. (10 October 1923); 0-6 at New York S.C. (4 November 1923)

The 1923–24 Philadelphia F.C. season was the second season for the club in the American Soccer League. The club finished the season in 7th place.

== American Soccer League ==
Date	Opponents	H/A	Result F–A	Scorers	Attendance
13 October 1923	National Giants F.C.	H	2-3	Dallas, Curran	
20 October 1923	J. & P. Coats F.C.	A	1-7	Bolton	
21 October 1923	Fall River F.C.	A	0-2		
28 October 1923	Brooklyn Wanderers F.C.	A	0-1		
4 November 1923	New York S.C.	A	0-6		
12 November 1923	Bethlehem Steel F.C.	H	0-1		
18 November 1923	Brooklyn Wanderers F.C.	A	0-4 (Note: Brooklyn was allowed to substitute for an injured player which was illegal at the time. A replay was ordered for January 13.)		1,500
25 November 1923	National Giants F.C.	A	2-2	Burnett, Curran	
8 December 1923	New York S.C.	H	1-0	Reekey	
15 December 1923	J. & P. Coats F.C.	H	2-4	Rudolph, Gibson	
1 January 1924	Brooklyn Wanderers F.C.	H	4-0	Nicholson, Cox, Rudolph (2)	
5 January 1924	Newark F.C.	H	1-0	Nicholson	
12 January 1924	Fall River F.C.	H	0-2		
13 January 1924	Brooklyn Wanderers F.C.	A	3-6 (Note: Replay of November 18 match.)		
20 January 1924	New York S.C.	A	0-0		
27 January 1924	Newark F.C.	A	2-1	Nicholson, Gibson	
9 February 1924	National Giants F.C.	H	2-3	Cox (2)	
16 February 1924	Bethlehem Steel F.C.	H	1-2	Bishop	
1 March 1924	New York S.C.	H	1-1	Curran	
8 March 1924	Brooklyn Wanderers F.C.	H	3-4	Andrews, Curran (2)	
15 March 1924	Fall River F.C.	H	0-3		
22 March 1924	J. & P. Coats F.C.	A	2-3	Andrews, Shearer	
24 March 1924	Fall River F.C.	A	0-4		
6 April 1924	National Giants F.C.	A	1-2	Curran	2,000
12 April 1924	Bethlehem Steel F.C.	A	0-4		
19 April 1924	Philadelphia F.C.	H	2-1	H. McDonald, Connors	
30 May 1924	Bethlehem Steel F.C.	A	0-2		

Pos	Club	Pld	W	D	L	GF	GA	GD	Pts
1	Fall River F.C.	27	19	6	2	59	19	+40	44
2	Bethlehem Steel F.C.	28	18	4	6	63	33	+30	40
3	New York S.C.	28	15	8	5	67	39	+28	38
4	J. & P. Coats F.C.	25	11	5	9	59	54	+5	27
5	Brooklyn Wanderers F.C.	27	9	5	13	47	57	-10	23
6	National Giants F.C.	26	6	6	14	36	64	-28	18
7	Philadelphia F.C.	26	5	3	18	30	64	-34	13
8	Newark F.C.	23	3	1	19	20	53	-33	7

Pld = Matches played; W = Matches won; D = Matches drawn; L = Matches lost; GF = Goals for; GA = Goals against; Pts = Points

== National Challenge Cup ==
Date	Round	Opponents	H/A	Result F–A	Scorers	Attendance
???	First Round; Eastern Division; Philadelphia District	???	???	???		
10 November 1923	Second Round; Eastern Division; Philadelphia District	Fleisher Yarn F.C.	???	2-1	Andrews, L. Braidford	
1 December 1923	Third Round; Eastern Division; Philadelphia District	Bethlehem Steel F.C.	A	0-5		

== American Football Association Cup ==
Date	Round	Opponents	H/A	Result F–A	Scorers	Attendance
24 November 1923	Second Round	Bethlehem Steel F.C.	H	1-2	own goal	

== Notes and references ==
Bibliography

- Jose, Colin (1998). The American Soccer League: The Golden Years of American Soccer 1921-1931. Lanham, Maryland: Scarecrow Press. ISBN 978-0810834293.
- Cahill, Thomas W., ed. (1923). Spalding's Official "Soccer" Football Guide 1923-24. Spalding's "Red Cover" Series of Athletic Handbooks, No. 55R. New York: American Sports Publishing Company.

Footnotes
