= 1922–23 Fall River F.C. season =

Fall River F.C.
1922–23 season
- Owner: Sam Mark
- Stadium: Mark's Stadium
- American Soccer League: 3rd
- National Challenge Cup: Second Round; Eastern Division; Southern New England Division
- Top goalscorer: Harold Brittan (19)
- Biggest win: 6 goals 6-0 vs. Philadelphia F.C. (25 February 1923)
- Biggest defeat: 5 goals 1-6 at Bethlehem Steel F.C. (31 March 1923)

The 1922–23 Fall River F.C. season was the first season for the club after the Fall River United franchise was purchased and relaunched by Sam Mark. The club continued to play in the American Soccer League and finished the season in 3rd place.

== American Soccer League ==
Date	Opponents	H/A	Result F–A	Scorers	Attendance
8 October 1922	J. & P. Coats F.C.	H	0-1		
22 October 1922	New York S.C.	H	2-4	Brittan, Pepper	
29 October 1922	Harrison S.C.	A	2-1	Lorimer, Reid	
12 November 1922	Harrison S.C.	H	2-1	Lorimer, Brittan	
19 November 1922	Paterson F.C.	H	0-0		
25 November 1922	Philadelphia F.C.	H	2-0	Reid (2)	
26 November 1922	Brooklyn Wanderers F.C.	A	3-1	Millar (3)	
3 December 1922	Philadelphia F.C.	H	2-0	Lorimer, Brittan	
10 December 1922	Bethlehem Steel F.C.	H	0-0		
17 December 1922	Brooklyn Wanderers F.C.	H	5-0	Brittan (2), 'Bunt' Munroe, Drummond (2)	
24 December 1922	Harrison S.C.	H	5-2	Brittan (2), Reid (2), 'Bunt' Munroe	
31 December 1922	J. & P. Coats F.C.	H	3-2	Reid, Wouterez, Brittan	
20 January 1923	Bethlehem Steel F.C.	A	2-3	Brittan, Reid	
4 February 1923	Paterson F.C.	H	0-2		
25 February 1923	Philadelphia F.C.	H	6-0	Reid (2), Kershaw (3), own goal	
4 March 1923	Brooklyn Wanderers F.C.	H	1-0	Drummond	
11 March 1923	Brooklyn Wanderers F.C.	H	1-1	Brittan	
17 March 1923	J. & P. Coats F.C.	A	1-3	Dalrymple	
24 March 1923	Philadelphia F.C.	A	1-0	Reid	
31 March 1923	Bethlehem Steel F.C.	A	1-6	Brittan	
7 April 1923	J. & P. Coats F.C.	A	1-2	Reid	
8 April 1923	Paterson F.C.	A	0-2		
15 April 1923	New York S.C.	A	3-1	Brittan (3)	
19 April 1923	Bethlehem Steel F.C.	H	1-1	Brittan	5,000
22 April 1923	Harrison S.C.	H	3-1	Lorimer, Brittan, Wouterez	
6 May 1923	New York S.C.	A	2-2	Brittan (2)	
13 May 1923	New York S.C.	H	3-0	Brittan, Reid (2)	
20 May 1923	Paterson F.C.	H	1-0	McPherson	

Pos	Club	Pld	W	D	L	GF	GA	GD	Pts
1	J. & P. Coats F.C.	28	21	2	5	68	30	+38	44
2	Bethlehem Steel F.C.	28	18	6	4	59	26	+33	42
3	Fall River F.C.	28	15	5	8	53	36	+17	35
4	New York S.C.	23	10	4	9	53	42	+11	24
5	Paterson F.C.	20	9	4	7	38	31	+7	22
6	Brooklyn Wanderers F.C.	25	5	5	15	24	52	-28	15
7	Harrison S.C.	23	4	2	17	26	56	-30	10
8	Philadelphia F.C.	25	3	2	20	24	72	-48	8

Pld = Matches played; W = Matches won; D = Matches drawn; L = Matches lost; GF = Goals for; GA = Goals against; Pts = Points

== National Challenge Cup ==
Date	Round	Opponents	H/A	Result F–A	Scorers	Attendance
14 October 1922	First Round; Eastern Division; Southern New England District	J. & P. Coats 2nd F.C.	H	4-0	Clarke, Lorimer, Cairney, Brittan	
4 November 1922	Second Round; Eastern Division; Southern New England District	J. & P. Coats F.C.	A	3-1	Brittan	

== Notes and references ==
Bibliography

- Jose, Colin (1998). The American Soccer League: The Golden Years of American Soccer 1921-1931. Lanham, Maryland: Scarecrow Press. ISBN 978-0810834293.
- Cahill, Thomas W., ed. (1922). Spalding's Official "Soccer" Football Guide 1922-23. Spalding's "Red Cover" Series of Athletic Handbooks, No. 55R. New York: American Sports Publishing Company.
- Cahill, Thomas W., ed. (1923). Spalding's Official "Soccer" Football Guide 1923-24. Spalding's "Red Cover" Series of Athletic Handbooks, No. 55R. New York: American Sports Publishing Company.

Footnotes
