= 1922–23 Brooklyn Wanderers F.C. season =

Brooklyn Wanderers F.C.
1922–23 season
- Stadium: Hawthorne Field
- American Soccer League: 6th
- New Jersey Soccer League: unknown
- National Challenge Cup: Second Round; Eastern Division; Southern New York Division
- Southern New York Football Association Cup: Winners
- Top goalscorer: Joe Bishop (3)
- Biggest win: 8 goals 8–0 at Atlas A.C. (15 October 1922)
- Biggest defeat: 5 goals 0–5 at Fall River F.C. (17 December 1922)

The 1922–23 Brooklyn Wanderers F.C. season was the first season for the club and its first season in both the New Jersey State Soccer League and the American Soccer League. The team was formed by the Bay Ridge F.C. to play in the New Jersey State League while the Bay Ridge team continued to play in the First Division of the amateur New York State Association Football League. The team left the New Jersey State League in the middle of the season to join the American Soccer League as its eighth club.

== New Jersey State Soccer League ==
Date	Opponents	H/A	Result F–A	Scorers	Attendance
17 September 1922	Babcock & Wilcox F.C.	H	???		
24 September 1922	???	H	???		
1 October 1922	Antler F.C.	A	???		
15 October 1922	Atlas A.C.	A	8–0		

== American Soccer League ==
Date	Opponents	H/A	Result F–A	Scorers	Attendance
18 November 1922	Philadelphia F.C.	A	2–1	Joe Bishop, Lawrence	
19 November 1922	New York S.C.	H	1–1	Joe Bishop	
26 November 1922	Fall River F.C.	H	1–3	Rew	
30 November 1922	Bethlehem Steel F.C.	H	0–1		
3 December 1922	Harrison S.C.	A	0–2		
9 December 1922	Philadelphia F.C.	A	3–2	Robertson, Rew, Morgan	
10 December 1922	Harrison S.C.	H	2–4	Lawrence, Morgan	
16 December 1922	J. & P. Coats F.C.	A	3–5	Rew, Agar, own goal	
17 December 1922	Fall River F.C.	A	0–5		
25 December 1922	New York S.C.	H	2–3	Robertson, Taylor	
30 December 1922	Bethlehem Steel F.C.	A	0–3		
21 January 1923	J. & P. Coats F.C.	H	0–3		
4 March 1923	Fall River F.C.	A	0–1		
10 March 1923	J. & P. Coats F.C.	A	0–3		
11 March 1923	Fall River F.C.	A	1–1	Robertson	
25 March 1923	Harrison S.C.	A	2–1	Baird, Dorward	
31 March 1923	J. & P. Coats F.C.	A	0–1		
7 April 1923	Bethlehem Steel F.C.	A	0–2		
8 April 1923	Bethlehem Steel F.C.	H	3–3	Taylor, Bleich (2)	
15 April 1923	Paterson F.C.	A	1–2	Lawrence	
22 April 1923	Paterson F.C.	A	2–2	Joe Bishop, Lawrence	
29 April 1923	Philadelphia F.C.	H	1–2 (Note: points awarded to Brooklyn due to Philadelphia using an ineligible player; GF & GA not counted in final standings)	Mennie	
6 May 1923	Harrison S.C.	H	0–0		
13 May 1923	Philadelphia F.C.	A	0–3 (Note: points awarded to Brooklyn due to Philadelphia using an ineligible player; GF & GA not counted in final standings)		
27 May 1923	New York S.C.	A	1–3	Hogg	

Pos	Club	Pld	W	D	L	GF	GA	GD	Pts
1	J. & P. Coats F.C.	28	21	2	5	68	30	+38	44
2	Bethlehem Steel F.C.	28	18	6	4	59	26	+33	42
3	Fall River F.C.	28	15	5	8	53	36	+17	35
4	New York S.C.	23	10	4	9	53	42	+11	24
5	Paterson F.C.	20	9	4	7	38	31	+7	22
6	Brooklyn Wanderers F.C.	25	5	5	15	24	52	-28	15
7	Harrison S.C.	23	4	2	17	26	56	−30	10
8	Philadelphia F.C.	25	3	2	20	24	72	−48	8

Pld = Matches played; W = Matches won; D = Matches drawn; L = Matches lost; GF = Goals for; GA = Goals against; Pts = Points

== National Challenge Cup ==
Date	Round	Opponents	H/A	Result F–A	Scorers	Attendance
7 October 1922	First Round; Eastern Division; Southern New York District	Yonkers Thistle F.C.	H	1–1 (aet)		
22 October 1922	First Round; Eastern Division; Southern New York District (replay)	Yonkers Thistle F.C.	H	3–1		
5 November 1922	Second Round; Eastern Division; Southern New York District	Brooklyn F.C.	H	1–2	Rew	

== Southern New York State Football Association Cup ==
Date	Round	Opponents	H/A	Result F–A	Scorers	Attendance
10 June 1923	Third Round	Lexington F.C.	H	3–0	Hogg (3)	
24 June 1923	Semifinals	Brooklyn F.C.	H	4–0	Hogg (3), Moore	
1 July 1923	Final	New York S.C.	A	1–1 (aet)	Hogg	
8 July 1923	Final (replay)	New York S.C.	A	???		

== Notes and references ==
Bibliography

- Jose, Colin (1998). The American Soccer League: The Golden Years of American Soccer 1921–1931. Lanham, Maryland: Scarecrow Press. ISBN 978-0810834293.
- Cahill, Thomas W., ed. (1922). Spalding's Official "Soccer" Football Guide 1922-23. Spalding's "Red Cover" Series of Athletic Handbooks, No. 55R. New York: American Sports Publishing Company.
- Cahill, Thomas W., ed. (1923). Spalding's Official "Soccer" Football Guide 1923–24. Spalding's "Red Cover" Series of Athletic Handbooks, No. 55R. New York: American Sports Publishing Company.

Footnotes
