= Jack Marshall (soccer) =

American soccer player (1892–1964)

Personal information
- Date of birth: 24 April 1892
- Place of birth: Baillieston, Scotland
- Date of death: 10 October 1964 (aged 72)
- Place of death: New Jersey, United States
- Height: 5 ft 9 1/2 in (1.77 m)
- Position: Defender

Senior career*
Years	Team	Apps	(Gls)
1911–1914	Saltcoats Victoria		
1914	Shettleston		
1914–1919	St Mirren	147	(31)
1918	→ Third Lanark (loan)	1	(0)
1919–1923	Middlesbrough	116	(0)
1923–1924	Llanelli		
1924–1925	Brooklyn Wanderers	35	(1)
1925–1927	Newark Skeeters	68	(6)
1927–1928	Brooklyn Wanderers	33	(2)
1928–1930	Bethlehem Steel	4	(0)
1928	→ Philadelphia Centennials (loan)		

International career
1919	Scotland (wartime)	1	(0)
1921–1924	Scotland	7	(0)
1926	United States	1	(1)

Managerial career
- 1950–1964: Yale Bulldogs
- * Club domestic league appearances and goals

John Marshall (24 April 1892 – 10 October 1964), nicknamed Jack or Jock, was an association football player, who represented both Scotland and the United States. His professional career took him to several clubs in Scotland, England, Wales and the United States. He earned seven caps with Scotland and one with the US national team.

== Professional career ==
Sources disagree on the year Marshall was born. According to his Bethlehem Steel biography, he was born in 1902. Further research suggests his birth was in 1892, as his playing career started with Saltcoats Victoria in 1911. Marshall began his professional career with St Mirren, playing for the club during the First World War period, at the end of which he was part of the team that won the 1919 Victory Cup, having already claimed a medal from the minor Paisley Charity Cup four years earlier.

In November 1919, St Mirren transferred Marshall to English club Middlesbrough for £2,000. In August 1923, Marshall signed with Welsh club Llanelli. He spent only a single season with Llanelli before moving to the United States to play for the Brooklyn Wanderers of the American Soccer League (ASL). While Marshall began the 1925–1926 season with Brooklyn, he moved to the Newark Skeeters after only two games. In 1927, he again began the season with Skeeters, before returning to the Wanderers after only four games. He then moved to Bethlehem Steel in August 1928. Bethlehem then loaned him out to the Philadelphia Centennials for a few games, but he was back in Bethlehem in December. He remained with Bethlehem until the team folded in 1930.

He is also reputed to have spent time with Greenock Morton.

== National team ==
=== Scotland ===
Between 1921 and 1924, Marshall earned seven caps with Scotland. His first cap came in a 2–1 victory over Wales on 12 February 1921. His seventh, and last, cap came almost exactly three years later in a 2–0 loss to Wales on 16 February 1924. He was captain for two matches, on 9 April 1921 and 4 February 1922.

=== United States ===
After he moved to the United States he was capped once with the United States national team on 6 November 1926; in that game, a 6–2 victory over Canada, Marshall scored a goal.

== Coaching career ==
Marshall coached the Yale Bulldogs men's soccer program from 1950 until his death in 1964.

== See also ==
- List of association footballers who have been capped for two senior national teams
- List of Scotland national football team captains
- List of United States men's international soccer players born outside the United States
