= 1922–23 Philadelphia F.C. season =

Philadelphia F.C.
1922-23 season
- Stadium: National League Park
- American Soccer League: 8th
- Top goalscorer: Percy Andrews (9)
- Biggest win: 2 goals 3-1 at Harrison S.C. (14 October 1922)
- Biggest defeat: 6 goals 0-6 at Fall River F.C. (25 February 1923)

The 1922–23 Philadelphia F.C. season was the first season for a new Philadelphia club in the American Soccer League after the Bethlehem Steel F.C. was transferred "back" to Bethlehem after playing the prior season as Philadelphia F.C. The new Philadelphia team was made up entirely of local players; the team struggled in the league, finishing the season last in 8th place.

== American Soccer League ==
Date	Opponents	H/A	Result F–A	Scorers	Attendance
7 October 1922	Bethlehem Steel F.C.	H	2-1	J. Rogers, McGhee	
8 October 1922	New York S.C.	A	0-5		
14 October 1922	Harrison S.C.	A	3-1	Fullerton, J. Rogers, Rooney	
15 October 1922	Harrison S.C.	H	4-3	Andrews (3), Rooney	
21 October 1922	Paterson F.C.	H	0-0		
28 October 1922	J. & P. Coats F.C.	H	0-3		
5 November 1922	Paterson F.C.	A	1-5	Fossett	
11 November 1922	New York S.C.	H	2-2	Andrews, Fossett	
18 November 1922	Brooklyn Wanderers F.C.	H	1-2	McGhee	
25 November 1922	Fall River F.C.	A	0-2		
2 December 1922	J. & P. Coats F.C.	A	1-3	McGhee	
3 December 1922	Fall River F.C.	A	0-2		
9 December 1922	Brooklyn Wanderers F.C.	H	2-3	Andrews, Morton	
31 December 1922	New York S.C.	H	1-4	Andrews	
20 January 1923	J. & P. Coats F.C.	H	2-6	Fullerton (2)	
24 February 1923	J. & P. Coats F.C.	A	2-3	Andrews, Miller	
25 February 1923	Fall River F.C.	A	0-6		
17 March 1923	Bethlehem Steel F.C.	A	1-5	Andrews	
24 March 1923	Fall River F.C.	H	0-1		
31 March 1923	Harrison S.C.	H	1-3	Ruiz	
2 April 1923	Bethlehem Steel F.C.	H	0-1		
8 April 1923	New York S.C.	A	1-6	McGhee	
21 April 1923	Bethlehem Steel F.C.	A	0-5		
29 April 1923	Brooklyn Wanderers F.C.	A	2-1 (Note: points awarded to Brooklyn due to Philadelphia using an ineligible player; GF & GA not counted in final standings)	Andrews, Curran	
13 May 1923	Brooklyn Wanderers F.C.	H	3-0 (Note: points awarded to Brooklyn due to Philadelphia using an ineligible player; GF & GA not counted in final standings)	Fullerton, McGhee (2)	

Pos	Club	Pld	W	D	L	GF	GA	GD	Pts
1	J. & P. Coats F.C.	28	21	2	5	68	30	+38	44
2	Bethlehem Steel F.C.	28	18	6	4	59	26	+33	42
3	Fall River F.C.	28	15	5	8	53	36	+17	35
4	New York S.C.	23	10	4	9	53	42	+11	24
5	Paterson F.C.	20	9	4	7	38	31	+7	22
6	Brooklyn Wanderers F.C.	25	5	5	15	24	52	-28	15
7	Harrison S.C.	23	4	2	17	26	56	-30	10
8	Philadelphia F.C.	25	3	2	20	24	72	-48	8

Pld = Matches played; W = Matches won; D = Matches drawn; L = Matches lost; GF = Goals for; GA = Goals against; Pts = Points

== Notes and references ==
Bibliography

- Jose, Colin (1998). The American Soccer League: The Golden Years of American Soccer 1921-1931. Lanham, Maryland: Scarecrow Press. ISBN 978-0810834293.
- Cahill, Thomas W., ed. (1922). Spalding's Official "Soccer" Football Guide 1922-23. Spalding's "Red Cover" Series of Athletic Handbooks, No. 55R. New York: American Sports Publishing Company.
- Cahill, Thomas W., ed. (1923). Spalding's Official "Soccer" Football Guide 1923-24. Spalding's "Red Cover" Series of Athletic Handbooks, No. 55R. New York: American Sports Publishing Company.

Footnotes
