= Sturdy Maxwell =

Scottish footballer (1898–??)

Personal information
- Full name: Thomas Maxwell
- Date of birth: c. 1898
- Place of birth: Scotland
- Position: Forward

Senior career*
Years	Team	Apps	(Gls)
1917–1919	Clyde	29	(3)
1919–1920	Dunfermline Athletic		
1920	Dumbarton Harp		
1920	Dumbarton	7	(0)
1920–1921	Dunfermline Athletic	1	(0)
1921	Arsenal	1	(0)
1922	Dunfermline Athletic	1	(0)
1923–1925	Bethlehem Steel	62	(7)
1925–1928	New Bedford Whalers	118	(19)
1928–1929	Philadelphia Centennial		
1928	→ Bethlehem Steel (loan)	1	(1)
1929	Bethlehem Steel	7	(1)
- * Club domestic league appearances and goals

Thomas "Sturdy" Maxwell (born circa 1898) was a Scottish football forward who played in Scotland, England and the United States.

== Career ==
Maxwell began his senior career with Clyde in 1917. In 1921, he took part in a 'Scotland' tour of North America organised by Third Lanark. At the time he played club football for Dunfermline Athletic who were playing in the Central League. Maxwell played in a game against Canada during the tour on 9 July 1921; this was not officially an international and therefore he did not receive a cap. In October 1921, Maxwell signed with Arsenal, but played only one Football League game and then moved back to Scotland, playing briefly for Dunfermline again and also going on trial with Aberdeen.

In January 1923, Maxwell signed with Bethlehem Steel of the American Soccer League. He played three seasons with Bethlehem, winning the 1924 American Cup with them. In March 1924, he was ejected from the Easter final of the 1923–24 National Challenge Cup for an altercation with Alec Lorimer. In 1925, Bethlehem released Maxwell who signed with the New Bedford Whalers. In 1928, Maxwell began the season with the Whalers. In October 1928, the Whalers briefly moved to the Eastern Soccer League, then rejoined the American Soccer League a few games later. During this turmoil, Maxwell left the Whalers and joined Centennial of the ESL. On 31 December 1928, the Centennials loaned Maxwell to Bethlehem Steel for one league game. In March 1929, Philadelphia sent Maxwell to Bethlehem Steel.
