= John Deal (soccer) =

American soccer player (1905–1983)

Jack Deal
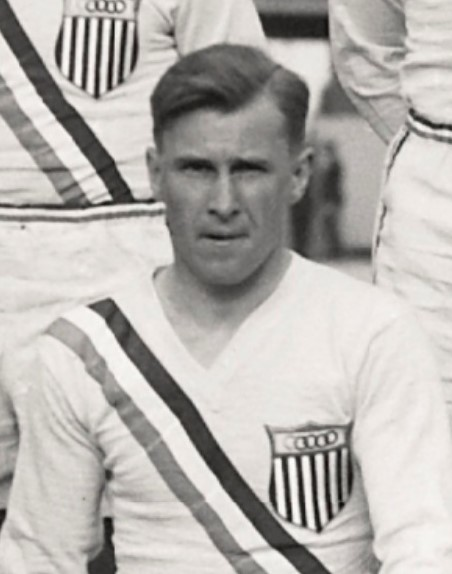
- John Deal in 1928

Personal information
- Full name: John J. Deal
- Date of birth: April 5, 1905
- Place of birth: Philadelphia, Pennsylvania, United States
- Date of death: February 1983
- Place of death: United States
- Position: Forward

Senior career*
Years	Team	Apps	(Gls)
1928	Wolfenden Shore		
1929	Philadelphia Centennials	?	(11)
1929–	New York Hispano		
	Newark Skeeters	2	(2)
1933–	Philadelphia German-Americans		
- Brooklyn Hispano
–1938	Philadelphia Passon		

International career
1928	United States	2	(0)
- * Club domestic league appearances and goals

Jack Deal (April 5, 1905 – February 1983) was an American soccer forward. He played five seasons in the second American Soccer League and earned two caps with the U.S. national team, one at the 1928 Summer Olympics.

== National team ==
Deal earned two caps with the U.S. national team in 1928. The first came at the 1928 Summer Olympics when the U.S. lost to Argentina 11–2. Following this loss, the U.S. tied Poland, 3–3, on June 10, 1928.

== Club career ==
In 1928, Deal played for Wolfenden Shore F.C. in the Allied American Football Association. He then went on to score eleven goals for the Philadelphia Centennials of the Eastern Professional Soccer League in the spring of 1929. He may have played the first half of the 1928–1929 season, but he did not make the goals list. At the end of the season, Philadelphia withdrew from the league and in August 1929, Deal signed with New York Hispano. However, at some time during the 1929–1930 season, he played two games, scoring two goals with the Newark Skeeters. The ESL continued to exist through 1930 when it folded. Deal's career becomes difficult to follow after 1929. After the collapse of the first American Soccer League (ASL) in spring 1933, it was quickly replaced by the second ASL that fall. Deal then played for the Philadelphia German-Americans from 1933 through at least 1935 when they won the league title. He then continued to play in the ASL until 1938, seeing time with Brooklyn Hispano and ending with Philadelphia Passon.
