= Robert Curtis =

Robert, Bob, or Bobby Curtis may refer to:

- Robert Curtis (actor), British actor
- Robert Curtis (basketball) (1990–2017), American basketball player
- Robert Curtis (British Army soldier) (1950–1971), first British Army soldier killed during the Northern Ireland Troubles
- Bob Curtis (actor) (1932–2004), American actor and priest
- Bob Curtis (American football) (1935–2013), American football coach
- Bob Curtis (footballer) (1950–2010), English football player
- Bob Curtis (politician) (1933–2021), American politician
- Bob Curtis (dancer), dancer and choreographer of modern dance.
- Bobby Curtis (American football) (born 1964), American football linebacker
- Bobby Curtis (runner) (born 1984), American distance runner
- Bobby Curtis (Scottish footballer), early 20th-century Scottish footballer

== See also ==
- Robert Curtis Brown (born 1957), American actor
- Robert Curtis Clark (1937–2020), Canadian politician
