= Raymond Hornberger =

American soccer player (1898–1976)

Ray Hornberger
Personal information
- Full name: Raymond Arthur Hornberger
- Date of birth: December 23, 1898
- Place of birth: Philadelphia, Pennsylvania, United States
- Date of death: May 28, 1976 (aged 77)
- Place of death: Philadelphia, Pennsylvania, United States
- Position: Center half

Senior career*
Years	Team	Apps	(Gls)
- Disston A.A.
1924–1925	Fleisher Yarn	5	(0)

International career
1924	United States	2	(0)
- * Club domestic league appearances and goals

Raymond Hornberger (December 23, 1898 – May 28, 1976) was an American soccer halfback. Hornberger earned four caps with the U.S. national team in 1924. His first two caps came in the 1924 Summer Olympics. The U.S. won its first game 1–0 against Estonia, but lost to Uruguay in the quarterfinals. Following its elimination from the tournament, the U.S. played two exhibition games. The U.S. defeated Poland, then lost to Ireland. That was Hornberger's last game with the national team. At some point prior to the Olympics, he played for Disston A.A. Following the Olympics, he played five games with Fleisher Yarn during the 1924–25 American Soccer League season. He died in Philadelphia, Pennsylvania.
