= Wattie Jackson =

Scottish footballer

Personal information
- Full name: Walter Darling Fleming Jackson
- Date of birth: 9 January 1898
- Place of birth: Hutchesontown, Scotland
- Date of death: 1951 (aged 52–53)
- Place of death: Chicago, United States
- Height: 5 ft 8 in (1.73 m)
- Position: Center forward

Youth career
- Christian Brothers College

Senior career*
Years	Team	Apps	(Gls)
- Yoker Athletic
1920–1923	Kilmarnock	68	(25)
1923–1924	Bethlehem Steel	23	(13)
1924–1926	Aberdeen	48	(18)
1925–1927	Preston North End	45	(13)
1927–1928	Bethlehem Steel	13	(6)
1928–????	Philadelphia Centennials	?	(7)
- * Club domestic league appearances and goals

Walter Darling Fleming "Wattie" Jackson (9 January 1898 – 1951) was a Scottish professional footballer who played as a center forward. He spent five seasons in the Scottish Football League, at least one in the English Football League and two in the American Soccer League.

Born in Glasgow but raised in Renton, West Dunbartonshire from a very early age, Jackson and his younger brother Alex both played professionally. In 1920, Jackson began his career with Kilmarnock of the Scottish Football League. In 1923, while visiting relatives in Detroit, Michigan, he came to the attention Bethlehem Steel who had recently lost center forward Daniel McNiven to the New York Field Club. The team tracked down Jackson in Michigan and offered him $25.00 per week to play for Bethlehem. This was nearly triple his salary in Scotland and on 25 August 1923, signed with the Steelmen, along with his brother.

After one season in the United States, the Jacksons returned to Scotland to join Aberdeen – Alex moved on after one season, but Wattie stayed for a second, although in October 1925 he joined Preston North End in the Football League. In 1927, he returned to the United States where he re-signed with Bethlehem Steel. He played only thirteen games that season before moving to the Philadelphia Centennials of the Eastern Professional Soccer League.
