= John Deal =

John Deal may refer to:

- John Kelsey Deal (1843–1892), American politician in the state of Iowa
- John Nathan Deal (born 1942), American politician in the state of Georgia
- John Deal (soccer) (1905–1983), American soccer forward
