= 1924 National Amateur Cup =

Tournament details
- Country: United States
- Dates: January 20 – April 20, 1924
- Teams: 81

Final positions
- Champions: Fleisher Yarn
- Runners-up: Swedish American

Tournament statistics
- Goals scored: 62

The 1924 National Amateur Cup was the USFA's annual cup-tie competition exclusively for amateur soccer teams. It was the second attempt but the first to be completed successfully. There were 81 entries of which Fleisher Yarn emerged as victors. The incentive in the tournament was that the winners would get to represent the U.S. at the Paris Olympics and each game was designated as an official "Olympic Tryout". It was believed that sending the champion amateur team would provide a squad with better chemistry than that of an all-star selection and require considerably less time to gel as a unit. However, as the tournament neared its final stages it became apparent that this idea might have to be reconsidered since the majority of the players on the remaining teams were foreign born and would not be eligible for the U.S. team. The only team with all American born players was the Union Electrics of St. Louis who had withdrawn at the quarterfinal stage. At the conclusion of the final game the eligible players on both the Fleisher Yarn and Swedish American teams were chosen while the remainder of the Olympic squad had to be selected from other amateur teams.

Round of 16 East

December 9, 1923	American A.A.	2-0	Kearny	Harrison, NJ
	Dick Porter, T. Strong			Stadium: Harrison Field; Referee: W. Fraser

December 22, 1923	Arlington Mills Junior	2-4	Boston Blues	Methuen, MA
	McDonough, Lynch		Corbett, Warren, McAleer (2)	Stadium: Gill Ave Grounds; Referee: J.R. Hoyle (Methuen)

December 22, 1923	Clan Robertson	3-2	Bunker Hill Celtic	Boston, MA
	25' MacGregor (pk), Stirling		35' Battles (pk), Graham (og), 85' Biggs	Stadium: Sullivan Square; Referee: J. Smith (Brockton)

December 22, 1923	Roxbury	2-1	Fore River B	Roxbury, MA
	78' Forrester, 89' Davidson (pk)		20' Jimmy Brown	Stadium: J.J. Connelly Playground; Referee: J. Gibson (Everett)

December 22, 1923	Clan Stewart	1-4	Worcester Rangers	Boston, MA
	25' Cummings		86' Campbell, 92' Henry, Pettigrew (2)	Stadium: Glendale Park; Referee: W.R. Welch (Boston)

January 19, 1924 REPLAY	Worcester Rangers	1-0	Clan Stewart	Worcester, MA
	Gordon			Stadium: Whittall Field; Attendance: 400; Referee: Braid

December 29, 1923	Fleisher Yarn	2-0	Sunshine	Philadelphia, PA
	Purvius			Referee: David Scott

January 1924	Steinway	W-L

January 1924	Calpe American	W-L

Round of 16 West

December 30, 1923	Memphis K of C	6-1	Izzy Rosens	Memphis, TN
	Epps, Sullivan, Hally (2), D. Walsh (2)		McDonald	Stadium: Hodges Field; Referee: Duff

January 6, 1924	St. Bridget's	0-2	Union Electric	St. Louis, MO
			Leahy, Coyle	Stadium: Fairground #4; Referee: M.J. Byrne

January 20, 1924	Magyar American	W-L	Fourth Intermediate Alumni	Cleveland, OH
				Stadium: West Tech Field

January 20, 1924	Akron Magyar	1-1	Sons of St. George	Akron, OH
	Butcher		J. Stevenson	Stadium: Wooster Stadium; Referee: P. Hamilton (Cleveland)

February 3, 1924 REPLAY	Sons of St. George	3-1	Akron Magyar	Akron, OH
	50', 2H' Hardman, W.McCall		Ross	Stadium: Wooster Stadium; Referee: P. Hamilton (Cleveland)

February 2, 1924	Jeannette	2-1	Morgan	Jeannette, PA
	25' Bookie, 88' Jaap		Morgan	Stadium: Athletic Field; Referee: George M. Brannigan

February 2, 1924	Westinghouse	0-2	Heidelberg	Turtle Creek, PA
			McCloskey, 70' Broggi	Stadium: Boy Scout grounds Attendance: 5000; Referee: Donaghy

February 3, 1924	Scarlet Runners	5-1	Ulster	Detroit, MI
	D. Sprott (3), Fallows, Stewart		Lindsay	Stadium: Solvay Park

February 1924	Swedish American	W-L	Scottish Bluebells

Eastern Quarterfinals

January 27, 1924	Steinway FC	6-1	Calpe American	Queens, NY
	Boyd (2), Cogan (2), McKinney (2)	Report	Costa	Stadium: Senator Oval

February 2, 1924	Boston Blues	0-4	Clan Robertson (Dorchester, MA)	Roslingdale, MA
	Sent Off - McShane 2H	Report	Maltman 1H 2H, Stirling 2H, McIntyre 2H Sent Off - Paul (GK) 2H	Stadium: J.J. Healy Playground; Referee: Thomas Ritchie

February 2, 1924	Roxbury	0-2	Worcester Rangers	Roxbury, MA
	Sent Off - Davison 1H	Report	Campbell 2’, Reauch 80’ Sent Off - Napier (GK) 1H	Stadium: Connelly Playground; Referee: W.R. Welch

February 9, 1924	Fleischer Yarn (Phi.)	3-1	American A.A. (Newark)	Philadelphia, PA
		Report		Stadium: Tenth & Butler St. Referee: James Walders
Note: American AA protest that referee James Walders ended the game 15 minutes early was denied.

Western Quarterfinals

January 20, 1924	Union Electric (St. L)	7-0	Memphis K of C (TN)	St. Louis, MO
	Eddie Lyons 8’ 11’ (PK) 1H 1H 2H, Frank Leahy 2H, Dave Goldsmith 2H	Report		Stadium: Fairground Park; Attendance: 300; Referee: J.H. Craddock

February 10, 1924	Heidelberg (W. Pa.)	3-3 (a.e.t.)	Jeannette (W. Pa.)	Heidelberg, PA
	Stengel 1H, Broggi 2H (Jones), Savage 94’	Report	Monstrolo 44’ (Jaap) 2H (Jaap) ET (Jaap)	Stadium: Heidelberg Field; Attendance: 4,000; Referee: E.J. Donaghy

February 16, 1924 REPLAY	Jeannette	2-4	Heidelberg	Pittsburgh, PA
	Schang 1H (Jaap), Johnny Jaap 1H	Report	Moreman 10’ (OG), Broggi 2H, Murphy ET (OG), Broggi ET	Stadium: Duquesne University; Attendance: 1,500; Referee: Bloom

February 17, 1924	Magyar Americans (Cle.)	4-1	Sons of St. George (Akron)	Cleveland, OH
	L. Hoffman 2H 2H 2H, Molnar 1H	Report	Hardman 2H	Stadium: Luna PArk; Referee: F.G. Protheroe

March 16, 1924	Scarlet Runners (Det.)	2-4	Swedish American FC (Chi.)	Detroit, MI
	Young 20’, Russell ET	Report	Brun 50’ 117’, Rundquist ET, Magnuson 120’	Stadium: Packard Park; Referee: W. Ferguson

Eastern Semifinals

March 1, 1924	Fleischer Yarn	W-L	Steinway FC	Philadelphia, PA
		Report		Stadium: Tenth & Butler St. Referee: James Walders

March 8, 1924	Worcester Rangers	2-2 (a.e.t.)	Clan Robertson	Worcester, MA
	Hendry (2)	Report	Russell, Caroll	Referee: Kirkland

March 22, 1924 REPLAY	Clan Robertson	1-2	Worcester Rangers	Boston, MA
	Carroll 2H	Report	Carlin 1H (PK), Hendry 1H	Stadium: Charlestown Playground

Western Semifinals

March 8, 1924	Magyar American	3-2	Heidelberg	Cleveland, OH
	N. Sziga 1H, A. Meywes 55’, L. Hoffman 80’	Report	Andy Savage 1H, George Caraffi 1H	Stadium: Luna Park; Referee: J.B. Storrie

Swedish American FC	w/o	Union Electric	Chicago, IL
	Report
Note: Union Electric withdrew

Union Electric withdrawal

The original plan was for the 1924 Amateur Cup champion to serve as the United States team in the 1924 Olympic soccer tournament. As the tournament reached the Quarterfinals, it was realized many of the teams had foreign born players who would be ineligible for the Olympic team. The U.S.F.A. decided instead to fill out the roster with players from different teams across the country along with players from the two teams in the final.

Union Electric management felt that since their team was the only one with a 100% Olympic eligible roster, all other teams remaining should be disqualified and the championship should be awarded to Union. Union also claimed there was no plan to reimburse their travel expense to Chicago to play Swedish American FC. When the U.S.F.A. declined Union's request to disqualify everyone else, they withdrew from the tournament.

Eastern Final

April 5, 1924	Fleischer Yarn	8-0	Worcester Rangers	Shawsheen Village, MA
	Andy Stradan 2H (Purvis) 2H 2H, Jim Purvis 1H 2H 2H, Duffy 2H, James McLaughlin 2H	Report		Stadium: Balmoral Park; Referee: Pat Darcy

Western Final

March 30, 1924	Magyar American	1-2	Swedish American FC	Cleveland, OH
	Mavis 48'	Report	Johnson 15’ (Lundquist), Rundquist 1H	Stadium: Luna Park; Attendance: 5,000; Referee: Tom Birks

Final

April 20, 1924	Swedish American FC	0-3	Fleischer Yarn	Chicago, IL
		Report	James McLaughlin 27’ (Stradan), Andy Stradan 59’ 2H (Galloway) Missed Penalty - Duffy 2H	Stadium: DePaul Field; Attendance: 4,000; Referee: Tom Parks

== See also ==
- 1923-24 National Challenge Cup
- 1924 American Cup
