= Johnny Grainger =

Scottish footballer

Personal information
- Place of birth: Scotland
- Position: Inside forward

Senior career*
Years	Team	Apps	(Gls)
- St Mirren
- Alloa Athletic
- Dumbarton
1922–1928	Bethlehem Steel	126	(33)
1928–1929	Fall River	36	(5)
1929	IRT Rangers	3	(0)
1929–1930	New Bedford Whalers	27	(5)
- * Club domestic league appearances and goals

Johnny Grainger was a Scottish association football inside forward who played professionally in the American Soccer League and Eastern Professional Soccer League.

In December 1922, Grainger signed with Bethlehem Steel. Grainger remained with Bethlehem Steel through the 1927–28 season. In August 1928, Grainger and Bethlehem Steel could not agree on a contract and the team placed him on the transfer list. Fall River picked him up and he played the 1928–1929 season in Massachusetts. In August 1929, Grainger moved to the IRT Rangers of the Eastern Professional Soccer League. He played four games, then moved to the New Bedford Whalers by November 1929.

== International ==
Grainger was called into the US for a 6 November 1926 game against Canada, but did not enter the game.
