= John Rattray =

John Rattray may refer to:

- John Rattray (skateboarder), Scottish skateboarder
- John Rattray (surgeon), Scottish surgeon
- Jock Rattray, Scottish footballer
