= 1929 Eastern Professional Soccer League =

1929 soccer season

1929 Eastern Professional Soccer League. The season began on September 2, 1929. By this time, the financial losses suffered by the American Soccer League, SNYSA and ESL had begun to mount. With the stock market crash a month later, the corporate sponsorship on which many of the teams depended began to dry up. Consequently, the ASL began negotiations with the USFA to rejoin the association. This led to additional negotiations regarding the merger of the ASL and ESL. As these went on, the ESL began its 1929-30 season. By the end of the first half in November 1929, Bethlehem Steel led the standings with twenty-three points off an 11-2-1 record.

== League standings ==
Team	GP	W	D	L	Pts	Pct.
Bethlehem Steel	13	11	0	2	22	.846
New York Hakoah	12	9	1	2	19	.792
New York Giants	12	8	2	2	18	.750
Newark Portuguese	11	4	3	4	11	.500
New York Hispano	10	3	2	5	8	.400
Victoria Hungaria	12	3	2	7	8	.333
Newark Skeeters	8	0	1	7	1	.063
IRT Rangers	10	0	1	9	1	.050
