= Billy Hogg (Scottish footballer) =

Scottish footballer

Personal information
- Place of birth: Scotland
- Position: Wing forward

Senior career*
Years	Team	Apps	(Gls)
1921–1922	Dundee United	9	(2)
1922–1925	Brooklyn Wanderers	71	(27)
1925–1926	Providence	23	(14)
1926–1927	Philadelphia	28	(9)
1927	Newark Skeeters	24	(17)
1927–1928	New York Giants	26	(4)
1929	Brooklyn Wanderers	1	(1)
- * Club domestic league appearances and goals

William Hogg was a Scottish association football wing forward who spent seven seasons in the American Soccer League.

== Career ==
Hogg began his career in his native Scotland, seeing time in nine league games for Dundee United F.C. during the 1921–1922 Scottish league season. In the fall of 1923, he signed with the Brooklyn Wanderers of the American Soccer League. He played only one league game, scoring a goal, that season. Over the next two seasons, he became a regular on the Brooklyn front line, scoring thirteen goals during the 1923–24 season. This put him tied for sixth on the league scoring list. Although he scored fourteen goals the next season, he was not among the top fifteen on the list as scoring across the league exploded. Despite his success, the Wanderers sent him to Providence F.C. seven games into the 1925–1926 season. In 1926, he moved to the Philadelphia Field Club. In August 1927, Hogg moved to the Newark Skeeters, but transferred to the New York Giants after fifteen games. During the 1928–1929 season, the Giants left the American Soccer League during the Soccer War and moved to the Eastern Professional Soccer League. Hogg played most of the season with Giants, but finished it with a single game, again scoring a lone goal, with the Brooklyn Wanderers.
