= IRT Rangers =

Interborough Rapid Transit Rangers, better known as the IRT Rangers, were an early twentieth century U.S. soccer team sponsored by the New York City Interborough Rapid Transit Company.

== History ==
In the mid-1920s the Rangers were an amateur team in the Southern New York Soccer Association (SNYSA). In 1928, the professional American Soccer League boycotted the National Challenge Cup. Three teams defied the boycott and were suspended by the league. This led the United States Football Association (USFA; now USSF) to declare the ASL an “outlaw league”. The USFA also bankrolled the creation of a league to rival the ASL. Named the Eastern Professional Soccer League, or Eastern Soccer League for short, the ESL was formed around the three suspended ASL teams and several teams, including the IRT Rangers, pulled from the SNYSSA. The ESL existed for one and a half seasons, beginning in the fall of 1928. Building on the core of several ex-ASL players, Rangers placed fourth in the first season but was at the bottom of the standings after the first half of the 1929-1930 season. During the mid-season break, the ASL capitulated to USFA and the ESL and ASL merged to create the Atlantic Coast Conference. The Rangers did not make the move to the new league. However, they did go to the third round of the 1930 National Challenge Cup.

== Homefield ==
During their short existence as a professional team, the Rangers held their home games at several fields, including Dyckman Oval, New York and McGoldrick Field, Greenpoint.

== Year-by-year ==
Year	League	Reg. season	Challenge Cup
1928-29	ESL	4th	First round
1929	ESL	8th	N/A
