= Johnny Rollo =

Scottish footballer

Personal information
- Place of birth: Glasgow, Scotland
- Place of death: Bethlehem, Pennsylvania, USA
- Position: Inside forward

Senior career*
Years	Team	Apps	(Gls)
1920–1922	St Rochs	?	(1)
1922–1923	Rangers	0	(0)
1923–1924	St Johnstone	129	(24)
1924–1930	Bethlehem Steel	141	(30)
1930–1931	Newark Americans	29	(5)
1931	New York Americans	9	(1)
Total		308	(61)

Managerial career
- 1933–1934: Portugal Club
- * Club domestic league appearances and goals

Johnny Rollo (born in Glasgow, Scotland; died Bethlehem, Pennsylvania) was a Scottish soccer player who typically played as an inside forward, but also as both a half back and full back. He began his career with Rangers F.C., but had his greatest success in the American Soccer League. He later coached at the amateur level.

== Player ==
In 1922, Rollo signed with Rangers F.C. of the Scottish Football League from Scottish junior side St Rochs Fc, after he scored the winning goal for St Rochs in the 1921-22 Scottish Junior Cup final, he played five reserve matches for Glasgow Rangers, but no first team games. In 1923, he moved to St Johnstone F.C. In September 1924, Rollo left Britain, arriving in Bethlehem, Pennsylvania on 16 September 1924 where he signed with Bethlehem Steel of the American Soccer League. When he joined Bethlehem, the team was disappointed with his form, but by February 1925, he had developed into a regular starter with the team. In 1928, the ASL expelled Bethlehem when the club defied the league's boycott of the 1929 National Challenge Cup. Bethlehem then joined the Eastern Soccer League. In the process, the United States Football Association declared the ASL an "outlaw league". In 1929, the ASL came in compliance with the USFA and the ESL merged into the ASL. Rollo remained with Bethlehem Steel until it folded in 1930. He then moved to the Newark Americans, but by that time, the American Soccer League was collapsing from the financial losses caused by the 1928-1929 Soccer War and the onset of the Great Depression. The Americans folded in 1931 and Rollo moved to the New York Americans.

== Coach ==
After his playing career, Rollo settled permanently in Bethlehem where he coached the amateur Portugal Club to the 1933-1934 Lehigh Valley Amateur Soccer League title, known as the Wilbur Cup.
