= Johnny Reid (footballer) =

Scottish footballer

Personal information
- Date of birth: 13 September 1896
- Place of birth: Glasgow, Scotland
- Date of death: 28 February 1980 (aged 83)
- Position: Inside right

Senior career*
Years	Team	Apps	(Gls)
- Montreal Blue Bonnets
1922–1926	Fall River	96	(37)
1926–1927	Philadelphia Field Club	19	(6)
1927	Brooklyn Wanderers	5	(1)
1927	J&P Coats	9	(0)
1928	Fall River	4	(2)
- * Club domestic league appearances and goals

Johnny Reid (13 September 1896 – 28 February 1980) was a Scottish footballer who played as an inside right, spending most of his career in the American Soccer League.

== Career ==
Although born in Scotland, Reid began his career with the Montreal Blue Bonnets in Canada before moving to the Fall River of the American Soccer League. He spent nearly four seasons in Fall River, winning three league title and one National Challenge Cup title. In the 1924 National Challenge Cup, Reid scored one of the "Marksmen's" four goals in their 4–2 victory over St. Louis Vesper Buick. In the fall of 1926, his career became erratic. He began the season with the 'Marksmen', but transferred to Philadelphia Field Club after only three games. Nineteen games later, he was with the Brooklyn Wanderers where he finished the season. He then began the 1927–1928 season with J&P Coats, but moved back to the 'Marksmen' after only nine games. He then played four games in Fall River and left the ASL.
