= Bob McGregor (footballer) =

Scottish footballer

Personal information
- Full name: Robert McGregor
- Place of birth: Govan, Scotland
- Positions: Left half; centre half

Senior career*
Years	Team	Apps	(Gls)
- Pollok
1919–1923	Morton	133	(4)
1923–1930	Bethlehem Steel	215	(19)
1930–1931	Newark Americans	41	(3)
Total		389	(26)
- * Club domestic league appearances and goals

Robert McGregor was a Scottish footballer who played professionally in Scotland and the American Soccer League.

McGregor played for Morton from 1919 to 1923, winning the 1922 Scottish Cup with them. In 1923, he left Scotland to join Bethlehem Steel in the American Soccer League. He played for Bethlehem until 1930, serving as team captain during the last few years with the team. During his time with Bethlehem Steel, the team won the 1924 American Cup, 1926 National Challenge Cup, two league titles and one league cup. In 1930, McGregor moved to the Newark Americans for at least one season.
