= Bethlehem Steel F.C. (disambiguation) =

Bethlehem Steel F.C. may refer to:

- Bethlehem Steel F.C. (1907–30), a five-time cup-winning American soccer club.
- Philadelphia Union II, a USL Championship soccer club formerly known as Bethlehem Steel FC.
