= David Robertson (footballer, born 1900) =

Scottish-American footballer

Personal information
- Full name: David Stewart Robertson
- Date of birth: 26 October 1900
- Place of birth: Kilmarnock, Scotland
- Date of death: 7 August 1985 (aged 84)
- Place of death: Los Angeles, California
- Position: Fullback

Senior career*
Years	Team	Apps	(Gls)
1920–1922	Kilmarnock	27	(0)
1922	→ Queen of the South (loan)	8	(0)
1922–1930	Brooklyn Wanderers	223	(33)

International career
1925	United States	1	(0)
- * Club domestic league appearances and goals

David Stewart Robertson (26 October 1900 – 7 August 1985) was a Scottish-American footballer who played in Scotland and in the American Soccer League. A full back, he earned one cap with the United States men's national soccer team.

== Biography ==
Robertson was born in Kilmarnock, Ayrshire, Scotland. After emigrating, he lived in New York and New Jersey, where he had two sons. He worked as a design engineer and moved to Santa Monica, California, where he became a U.S. citizen in 1942.

== Club career ==
=== Scotland ===
Robertson played for Dreghorn Juniors before making his debut in senior football for home town club Kilmarnock F.C. in the Scottish Football League. Robertson then went to Dumfries side Queen of the South F.C. on loan for whom he played eight games from August to October 1922.

=== United States ===
In 1922, Robertson moved to the United States where he played with Brooklyn Wanderers of the American Soccer League from 1922 to 1930. Another ex Queen of the South player joined him at Wanderers around the same time, Bobby Curtis.

In Robertson's time Wanderers played in the one off International Soccer League played for between US and Canadian clubs in the Summer and Autumn of 1926. Wanderers won the competition. Their best ASL season finish in Robertson's time were a 3rd in 1924/25 and a 2nd in 1928/29.

== National team ==
He earned one cap with the U.S. national team in a 6–1 victory over Canada on November 8, 1925. The game was played in Brooklyn with Archie Stark scoring five goals.

== See also ==
- List of United States men's international soccer players born outside the United States
