= Jack Forrest (footballer, born 1892) =

English footballer

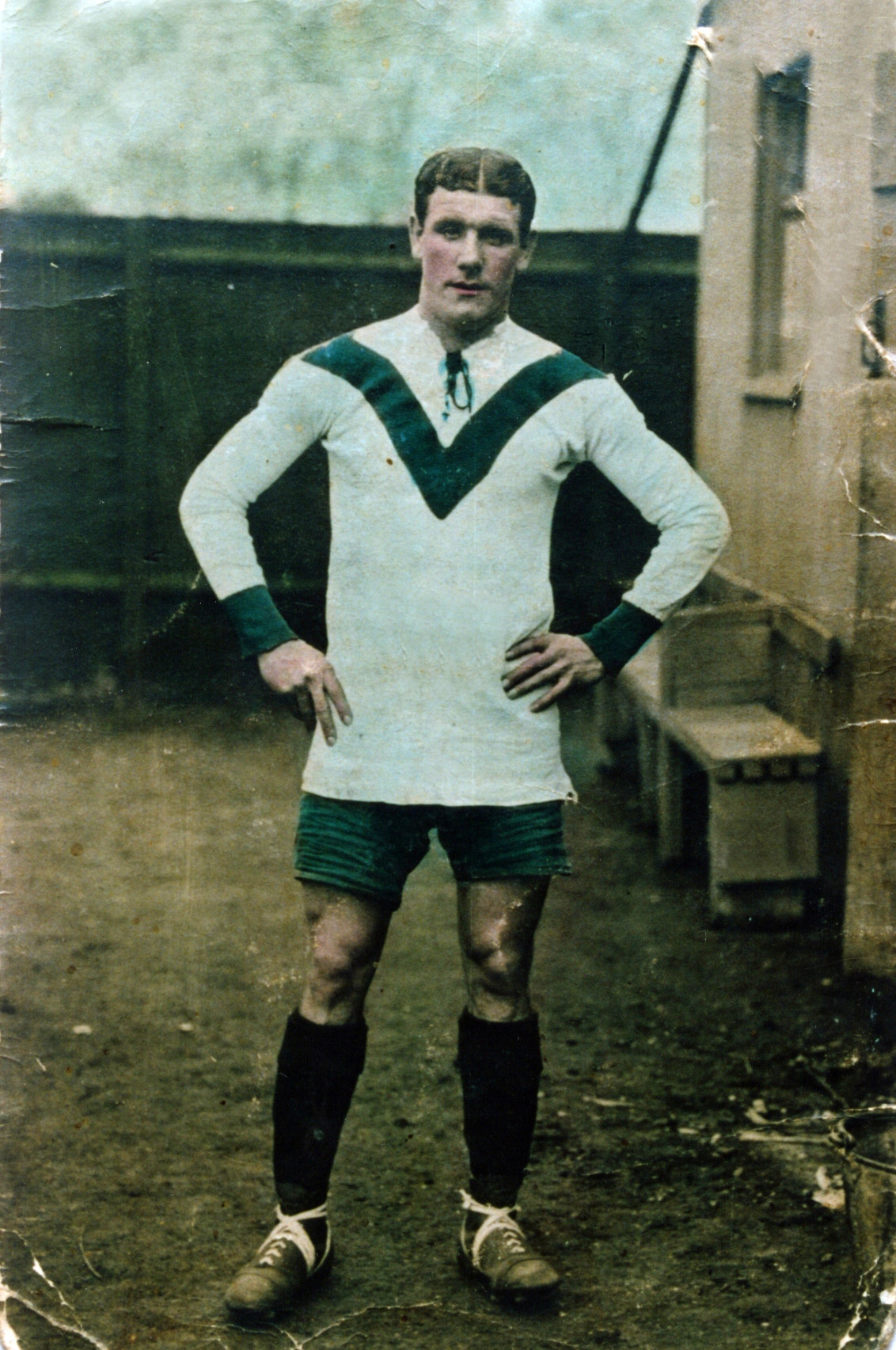
- Jack Forrest, Clapton Orient, circa 1917

Personal information
- Full name: James Henry Forrest
- Date of birth: 1892
- Place of birth: Shildon, England
- Height: 5 ft 8 1/2 in (1.74 m)
- Position: Right half

Senior career*
Years	Team	Apps	(Gls)
- Sunderland West End
–1913	Houghton Rovers		
1913–1920	Clapton Orient	126	(10)
1922–1923	Northampton Town	2	(0)
- Spennymoor United
- * Club domestic league appearances and goals

James Henry Forrest was an English professional footballer who made over 120 appearances as a right half in the Football League for Clapton Orient. He also played league football for Northampton Town.

== Personal life ==
Forrest served as a gunner in the British Army during the First World War.

== Career statistics ==
Appearances and goals by club, season and competition
Club	Season	League			FA Cup		Total	
Club	Season	Division	Apps	Goals	Apps	Goals	Apps	Goals
Clapton Orient	1914–15	Second Division	31	2	1	0	32	2
Career total			31	2	1	0	32	2

== Honours ==
Sunderland West End

- Monkwearmouth Charity Cup
