= Andy Stevens =

English-Canadian soccer player

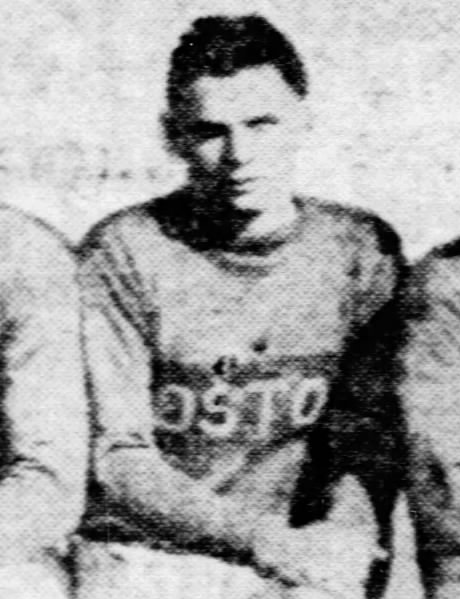

Personal information
- Date of birth: August 1901
- Place of birth: Brandon, Durham, England
- Date of death: July 27, 1968 (aged 66)
- Place of death: Toronto, Ontario, Canada
- Position: Center forward

Youth career
- Parkside Rangers (Toronto)

Senior career*
| Years | Team | Apps | (Gls) |
| 1920–21 | Pullman | | |
| 1923 | Toronto Willys Overland | | |
| 1923 | Toronto Scottish | | |
| 1923–24 | Detroit F.C. | | |
| 1924 | Toronto Davenport Albion | | |
| 1924–25 | Boston Soccer Club | 28 | (27) |
| 1924–29 | New Bedford Whalers | 140 | (123) |
| 1929–30 | Bridgeport Hungaria | 2 | (0) |
| 1929–30 | New York Nationals | 7 | (2) |
| 1929–30 | Toronto Scottish | | |
| 1930–33 | Toronto British Consols | | |

Managerial career
- 1929–1930: Bridgeport Hungaria
- 1947: Toronto East End Canadians
- 1950: Toronto Oakwoods
- * Club domestic league appearances and goals

Andy Stevens (born in England) was an English-Canadian soccer center forward who began and ended his career in Canada but also spent six seasons in the American Soccer League. He was a two time league leading scorer with the ASL and was a member of the Canada Soccer Hall of Fame's 2006 Team of Distinction, the 1933 Toronto Scottish. In 2017, as part of the "Legends Class" he was elected to the Hall of Fame as an individual player.

== Professional career ==
Stevens, born in north-east England, came to Canada in 1905. In 1920, he left Canada to sign with Pullman F.C. in Chicago. By 1923, he was back in Canada where he briefly played for Toronto Willys Overland and Toronto Scottish before joining Detroit F.C that year. In 1924, he Stevens signed with the Boston Soccer Club of the American Soccer League. Boston transferred him to the New Bedford Whalers just over halfway through the season. Stevens led the ASL in scoring twice: 1925-1926 (44 goals) and 1927-1928 (30 goals). Stevens remained with the Whalers until 1928–1929 season, but left the team after fifteen games to sign with the New York Giants of the Eastern Professional Soccer League. With the merger of the ESL and ASL in 1929, several teams from the ESL petitioned for entry into the new league. New York Hispano, of the ESL, moved to Bridgeport, Connecticut under the new name Bridgeport Hungaria. The team ownership hired Stevens to coach the team. In March 1930, Hungaria folded ten games into the season. Stevens then moved to the New York Nationals for the last few games of the season. The Nationals folded at the end of the season and Stevens returned to Canada where he joined Toronto Scottish. He won the Canadian championship in 1932 with Scottish. On June 11, 1933, Toronto Scottish met Stix, Baer and Fuller F.C., the reigning National Challenge Cup champion in a one time North American Soccer Championship. Toronto took the game 2–1. Stevens served in the Canadian Army in World War Two.

== Managerial career ==
In 1947 he became coach of Toronto East End Canadians in the National Soccer League and in 1950 of Toronto Oakwoods.
