= Bobby Drummond =

Scottish footballer

Personal information
- Place of birth: Scotland
- Position: Inside forward

Senior career*
Years	Team	Apps	(Gls)
- Arbroath
1922–1923	Fall River	8	(3)
1923–1927	J&P Coats	106	(35)
1927	Fall River	2	(1)
1927	Newark Skeeters	8	(2)
1927–1928	J&P Coats	21	(3)
1928–1929	New Bedford Whalers	4	(0)
- * Club domestic league appearances and goals

Robert B. Drummond was a Scottish association football inside forward who spent most of his career in the American Soccer League.

== Career ==
Drummond may have begun his career with Arbroath F.C. in his native Scotland. In 1923, he played a handful of games with the Fall River at the end of the 1922–23 American Soccer League season. In September 1923, he moved to J&P Coats.

His best season came in 1924-25 when he scored eighteen goals in forty-two league games, putting him ninth on the league scoring table. His production quickly tapered off. During the 1925-26 season, he scored eleven goals (ten league and one cup) in thirty-two games (twenty-eight league and four cup games). This led to J&P Coats sending him to back to the 'Marksmen' during the 1926-1927 season.

He played only two games in Fall River before moving to the Newark Skeeters for the end of the season. He began the 1927-28 season in Newark, but again moved, this time back to J&P Coats during the season.

In 1928, he joined the New Bedford Whalers where he played only four games over two seasons.
