= Bob Curtis (dancer) =

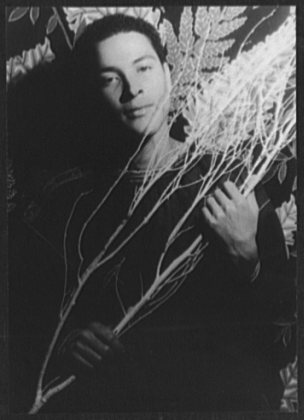
- Curtis by Carl Van Vechten, 1955
- Born: Robert Leroy Curtis; September 1, 1925; Leflore County, Mississippi
- Died: December 9, 2009 (aged 84); Vienna, Austria
- Occupations: Dancer, choreographer

Robert Leroy "Bob" Curtis (September 1, 1925 – December 9, 2009) was an American-born dancer and choreographer. Curtis was known for developing an "Afro-contemporary" dance style that combined modern dance techniques with African dance traditions. Active in the United States and Europe, he studied with major figures including Martha Graham and Katherine Dunham before establishing a long career in Italy and Austria.

== Biography ==
Robert Leroy Curtis was born in 1925 in Leflore County, Mississippi, to biracial parents who had been born into slavery. After serving in the United States Navy during World War II, he began formal dance training in 1946 at the San Francisco Ballet School, where he studied for three years. He later received a scholarship to attend George Balanchine's American Ballet School in New York City.

In New York, Curtis continued his studies with Martha Graham and Katherine Dunham. Although he was familiar with Black movement traditions through his rural Mississippi church upbringing, his first formal exposure to Black dances came through Dunham, whose choreography introduced African diasporic techniques to broader American audiences.

Between 1949 and 1952, Curtis worked with Dunham's Experimental Group, touring extensively in Cuba, Haiti, and Puerto Rico. During these tours, the ensemble studied local traditional dances, experiences that became formative for Curtis' artistic development. The research and training he undertook during this period contributed significantly to the creation of his later "Afro-contemporary" style.

In April 1952, Curtis made his Broadway debut as one of six dancing angels in the revival of Gertrude Stein's 1934 opera Four Saints in Three Acts at Broadway Theater. The production featured an all-Black cast, starring Leontyne Price, and featured choreography by William Dollar. The New York presentation preceded a European tour that included a performance at the Théâtre des Champs-Élysées in Paris.

Curtis then joined the José Limón Dance Company, but his career was temporarily halted after he was involved in a car crash in 1954. In the mid-1950s, Curtis moved to Europe and settled in Rome, which remained his home for over three decades. Although Italy's dance scene offered limited opportunities for modern dancers, many American performers found employment through Italian television productions, and Curtis initially worked as a dancer on television programs. In 1970, together with Italian modern dancer Elsa Piperno, he co-founded Teatrodanza Contemporaneo in Rome, considered Italy's first modern dance school and company.

By 1975, Curtis had returned to New York, where he taught Arthur Mitchell's Dance Theatre of Harlem. He eventually returned to Italy and founded his own company, Compagnia Afro Danza, in 1977. He directed the company for seventeen years, touring extensively throughout Europe.

In 1994, increasing financial pressures and changing sociopolitical conditions in Italy led Curtis to relocate to Vienna after accepting a teaching position there. He subsequently taught at the Bruckner Conservatory and the Vienna State Opera and remained in Austria until his death in Vienna in 2009 at the age of 84. He was buried at the Vienna Central Cemetery.
