= Tucker Croft =

Northern Irish footballer (??–1955)

Personal information
- Full name: Thomas Croft
- Place of birth: Belfast, Ireland
- Date of death: 1955
- Place of death: Northern Ireland
- Position: Inside right

Youth career
- Dundela

Senior career*
Years	Team	Apps	(Gls)
1918–1921	Glentoran	39	(10)
1921–1924	Queen's Island	?	(?)
1924–1926	Fall River	75	(36)
1926–1927	J & P Coats	10	(3)
1927	Fall River	3	(3)
1927	Newark Skeeters	5	(1)
1927–1928	New York Nationals	8	(2)
1928–1929	Newark Skeeters	1	(0)
1928–1929	Queen's Island	?	(?)
1929–1930	Glentoran	27	(5)
1930	Glenavon		
1930–1931	Dundela		
1931–1933	Drumcondra		(6)

International career
1922–1924	Ireland	3	(1)
- * Club domestic league appearances and goals

Thomas "Tucker" Croft was an Irish international footballer who played professionally in Ireland and the United States as an inside right.

== Club ==
Born in Belfast, Croft played in his native Ireland for Dundela, Glentoran and Queen's Island. In 1924, he left Northern Ireland for the United States, joining the Fall River of the American Soccer League. He was under contract to Queen's Island at the time and the move led to his suspension by the IFA. During his time with the 'Marksmen' he was noted for his discipline problems and in 1925, he petitioned the Irish Football Association for re-admittance. When this was denied, he returned to Fall River. In 1926, Croft began the season with Fall River, but moved to J & P Coats after fourteen games. Croft was back with Fall River for the start of the 1927–1928 season, but quickly moved to the Newark Skeeters. In December 1927, the New York Nationals purchased Croft's contract. He played only eight games for the Nationals, and was back with the Skeeters for the 1928–1929 season, but played only one game before returning to Northern Ireland. The IFA re-admitted Croft on 7 December 1928 and he played with both Queen's Island and Glentoran, before retiring in 1930.

== International ==
Croft also represented Ireland at international level between 1922 and 1924, scoring one goal in three appearances. The goal was the winning goal against England, and marked the first win for Ireland over England following the advent of the partition of Ireland in 1922.
