= Jim Purvis =

Scottish footballer

Personal information
- Full name: James Purvis
- Place of birth: Scotland
- Position: Inside forward

Senior career*
Years	Team	Apps	(Gls)
1922–1925	Fleisher Yarn		
1925–1926	Bethlehem Steel	22	(21)
1926–1927	Indiana Flooring	23	(7)
1927–1928	New York Nationals	10	(2)
1928–1929	Philadelphia	29	(13)
1929	Brooklyn Wanderers	1	(0)
1929	Bridgeport Bears	2	(0)
1929	Philadelphia	6	(0)

Managerial career
- 1935–: Philadelphia United German-Hungarians
- * Club domestic league appearances and goals

Jim Purvis was a Scottish former football inside forward who played professionally in the American Soccer League.

Purvis played for several youth teams, but never played professionally in Scotland before moving the United States and settling in Philadelphia, Pennsylvania. In 1922, he joined Fleisher Yarn which played in the Allied Amateur League of Philadelphia. Fleisher moved up to the American Soccer League in 1924 and Purvis scored seventeen goals in thirty-five league games and another two goals in two league cup games. On July 29, 1925, Purvis signed with Bethlehem Steel. Purvis scored twenty-one goals in twenty-two games before suffering a season ending ankle injury in April 1926. Bethlehem sent him to Indiana Flooring at the end of the season. He played one season with Indiana before moving to the New York Nationals for the 1927-1928 season. He moved again, beginning the 1928-1929 season with Philadelphia F.C. and finishing it with the Brooklyn Wanderers. He moved to the Bridgeport Bears in the fall of 1929, but when the team experienced significant financial difficulties with the onset of the Great Depression, the team merged with Philadelphia where Purvis finished his professional career.

In August 1935, Philadelphia United German-Hungarians hired Purvis to manage the team.
