= Andy Straden =

American soccer player

Personal information
- Full name: Andrew John Straden
- Date of birth: November 24, 1897
- Place of birth: Bothwell, Scotland
- Date of death: June 1967
- Place of death: Philadelphia, Pennsylvania, United States
- Position: Center forward

Senior career*
Years	Team	Apps	(Gls)
1924–1925	Fleisher Yarn	34	(20)
1925	Shawsheen Indians	5	(5)
1925–1926	New York Giants	18	(6)

International career
1924	United States	4	(3)
- * Club domestic league appearances and goals

Andy Straden (also spelled Stradan) (November 27, 1897 – June 1967) was a soccer forward who was a member of the 1924 U.S. Olympic Team and played professionally in the first American Soccer League.

== American Soccer League ==
Straden, was an amateur player in the early 1920s with Fleisher Yarn when the team won the 1924 National Amateur Cup. That summer, he was selected to play with the United States at the Summer Olympics. When he returned to America, Straden rejoined Fleisher Yarn for the 1924-1925 American Soccer League season. This was Yarn's first season as a professional club and its first season in the ASL. Straden scored twenty goals in thirty-four games that season before moving to the Shawsheen Indians for the start of the 1925–1926 season. However, the Indians folded two months into the season and he ended the season with the New York Giants. He played only two games with the Giants during the 1926–1927 season and retired.

== National and Olympic teams ==
At the 1924 Summer Olympics, the U.S. fielded an entirely amateur side, including Straden. In the four games that year, two at the games and two during a European exhibition tour following the United States's elimination. In the first United States game of the Olympics, the team defeated Estonia off a tenth minute Straden penalty kick. Uruguay, the dominant national team of the era, easily eliminated the United States in the next round. Following their elimination, the United States defeated Poland in Warsaw, 3–2. Two of the United States goals came from Straden. Then the United States fell to Ireland in Dublin. Aside from those four games that year, Straden never again suited up for the national team.

== See also ==
- List of United States men's international soccer players born outside the United States
