= 1928–29 Eastern Professional Soccer League =

The Eastern Professional Soccer League season ran from Fall 1928 to Spring 1929 with a mid-winter break. By the end of the first half, only the New York Giants and New York Hakoah had played all eighteen games. New York Celtic had dropped out after eight games and the rest of the teams had played either fourteen or fifteen games. Bethlehem Steel led the league with twenty-eight points off a 14–1–0 record. The second half of the season began with a different lineup than the first half. Celtic, as already mentioned, had dropped out. New York Hungaria joined the league from the Southern New York Soccer Association and New Bedford Whalers joined from the American Soccer League. Whalers lasted only eight games before returning to the ASL. Newark Skeeters played nine games then also dropped out. At the end of the Spring half, Bethlehem led the league with 49 points, taking the league championship.

== League standings ==
                First Half   (as of 12/28/28)
                         GP   W   L   D  Pts.  Pct.
Bethlehem Steel          15  14   1   0    28  .933
New York Giants          18  11   5   2    24  .667
New York Hakoah          18  10   4   4    24  .667
Newark Skeeters          14   3   6   5    11  .393
IRT Rangers              15   5   9   1    11  .367
Philadelphia Centennials 14   3   7   5    10  .357
New York Hispano         14   2  10   2     6  .214
New York Celtics          8   0   6   2     2  .125

               Second Half (as of 4/29/1929)
                         GP   W   L   T  GF  GA  PTS
New York Hakoah          18  12   2   4  68  23   28
Bethlehem Steel          15   9   2   4  41  21   22
IRT Rangers              13   7   5   1  30  30   15
New York Hungaria        16   6   8   2  31  44   14
New York Giants          15   6   8   1  52  24   13
New Bedford Whalers       8   6   1   1  26  14   13
New York Hispano         16   4  11   1  36  49    9
Philadelphia Centennials 12   3   9   0  24  50    6
Newark Skeeters           9   0   7   2   9  30    2
New York Celtics         (Disbanded after two months)
