= Jimmy McGhee =

Scottish-American soccer player

Personal information
- Full name: James McGhee Jr
- Place of birth: Edinburgh, Scotland
- Position: Inside forward

Senior career*
Years	Team	Apps	(Gls)
1920–1921	Wolfenden Shore		
1921–1922	Harrison S.C.	5	(0)
1922–1923	Philadelphia Field Club	22	(6)
1924–1926	Philadelphia Field Club	16	(0)
- * Club domestic league appearances and goals

James McGhee Jr (born in Edinburgh, Scotland) was a Scottish soccer inside forward who spent at least four seasons in the first division American Soccer League.

== Youth ==
McGhee was the son of former Hibernian player and Heart of Midlothian manager James McGhee, and the brother of National Soccer Hall of Fame forward Bart McGhee. McGhee's father was a renowned Scottish player who appeared with Scotland in an 1886 game with Wales. McGhee's father had a controversial term as the manager of Hearts. When he finally resigned on 6 December 1909, he began assessing his options. In September 1910 he decided to leave Scotland and emigrate to the United States. It took James McGhee two years to get settled and it was not until 1912 that Jimmy, his mother and brother Bart joined his father in the U.S. When they arrived in the U.S., the family settled in Philadelphia, Pennsylvania.

== Playing ==
=== Amateur ===
McGhee spent at least one season, 1920–21, playing alongside his brother Bart on the front line of Wolfenden Shore of the Allied American Football Association.

=== Professional ===
In 1921, McGhee signed with Harrison S.C. of the newly established American Soccer League. In 1922, he moved to Philadelphia Field Club for the 1922–23 season. In 1924, he rejoined the team for two seasons.

== Misspelled last name ==
Some sources list McGhee as Magee when he played for Harrison S.C.
