= Bobby Curtis (Scottish footballer) =

Scottish footballer

Personal information
- Place of birth: Scotland
- Position: Inside forward

Senior career*
Years	Team	Apps	(Gls)
- Queen of the South
1923–1925	Brooklyn Wanderers	64	(18)
1925–1926	Providence	19	(10)
1926–1927	J&P Coats	35	(7)
1927–1929	Brooklyn Wanderers	88	(29)
1929–1930	New York Nationals	1	(0)
1930	New York Americans	16	(0)
- * Club domestic league appearances and goals

Bobby Curtis was an early twentieth-century Scottish footballer.

Curtis began his career in his native Scotland with Dumfries club, Queen of the South. He moved to the United States where he signed with the Brooklyn Wanderers of the American Soccer League. At Wanderers he played beside another ex Queen of the South player, David Robertson. He spent eight years playing professionally in the United States. This included two spells with Wanderers and four other clubs across four seasons. He scored 68 goals in 234 games in the ASL.
