= Nat Agar =

English-American soccer player and executive (1887–1978)

Personal information
- Full name: Nathan Agar
- Date of birth: July 26, 1887
- Place of birth: Sheffield, England
- Date of death: June 24, 1978 (aged 89)
- Place of death: New York City, United States
- Position: Striker

Senior career*
Years	Team	Apps	(Gls)
1905–1913	Critchleys		
1916–1917	New York Clan MacDonald		
1919–1920	Longfellows		
1922–1925	Brooklyn Wanderers	10	(1)

Managerial career
- 1922–1929: Brooklyn Wanderers
- 1925–1926: United States
- * Club domestic league appearances and goals

Nathan "Nat" Agar (July 26, 1887 – June 24, 1978) was an English-American soccer player, coach, referee, team owner and league executive. He was part of the formation of the United States Football Association, but later fought it as a team owner and league official of the American Soccer League and Southern New York State Football Association during the 1928 "Soccer War." He also coached three United States national team games against Canada in 1925 and 1926.

== Early career ==
At some point in the early 1900s, Agar immigrated to the United States from his native England. In 1905, he founded his first team, Critchleys. In 1906, he was instrumental in the founding of the New York Amateur Association Football League. Agar was elected as the league's secretary, a position he held until at least 1911. He was also president of the league in 1910. In January 1909, Agar broke his leg while challenging for the ball. He remained with Critchleys until it folded following the 1912–13 season. He then played at least one season, 1916–17 with New York Clan MacDonald of the New York State Association Football League and at least one season, 1919–20 with Longfellows of the New York State League.

=== Referee ===
Agar also served as a referee for the New York Amateur Association League, being assaulted while officiating a game in April 1910.

== USFA ==
While Agar was part of the founding of the United States Football Association in 1913. However, he later became one of the major forces opposing the USFA during the 1928–1929 "Soccer War."

== American Soccer League ==
In 1922, Agar entered the realm of professional team ownership when he entered the Brooklyn Wanderers into the American Soccer League. The ASL was set for its first season and the Wanderers would play at Hawthorne Field, a dedicated soccer facility owned by Agar. Agar also chose to manage the team and played several games during the team's first two seasons. In 1926, Hakoah Vienna, one of the top Austrian teams toured the U.S. The team was composed entirely of Jews, many of whom were favorably impressed with the United States. Agar, who was also Jewish, immediately began negotiations to sign the players and in December 1926, brought the several Hakoah stars to the Wanderers. Despite the additional talent, the Wanderers remained a mid-table team for much of its existence.

== Southern New York State Football Association ==
During the Soccer War, the USFA brokered the creation of the Eastern Soccer League composed of three teams suspended from the American Soccer League as well as several teams from the Southern New York State Football Association. The SNYFA considered the ESL to be encroaching on its territory, and, when the association president, Dr. Manning, resigned, Agar was elected in his place. Agar then led the SNYFA in leaving the USFA and allying itself with the ASL against the USFA.

== National team coach ==
In June 1926, Agar was selected to coach the U.S. national team in a two-game, home and away, series with Canada. The U.S. lost the first, 1–0, in Canada, but won the November rematch 6–1, in the U.S. On June 11, 1926, Agar again led the U.S. to a 6–2 victory over Canada.

== See also ==
- List of Jews in sports (non-players)
