= Alec Lorimer =

Scottish footballer (1896–??)

Personal information
- Full name: Alexander Lorimer
- Date of birth: December 8, 1896
- Place of birth: Kilmarnock, Scotland
- Position: Forward

Senior career*
Years	Team	Apps	(Gls)
- Hurlford
1920–1921	Kilmarnock	1	(0)
1921–1922	Philadelphia Field Club	19	(2)
1922–1925	Fall River	74	(12)
1925	Shawsheen Indians	20	(9)
1925–1928	New Bedford Whalers	116	(20)
1928–1929	J&P Coats	37	(1)
1929–1931	New Bedford Whalers	45	(6)
- * Club domestic league appearances and goals

Alexander "Alec" Lorimer was a Scottish association football half back who played professionally in the American Soccer League.

Lorimer began his career with Hurlford F.C. in the Scotland Western Football League. He then played one game for Kilmarnock F.C. during the 1920-1921 season. In 1921, Lorimer left Scotland to join Philadelphia Field Club of the American Soccer League. Philadelphia won the league title that year. In August 1922, Lorimer moved to the Fall River, playing for them until 1924. In March 1924, he instigated an altercation with Sturdy Maxwell in the Easter final of the 1923–24 National Challenge Cup. This led to six-month suspension in national competitions. In 1925, the 'Marksmen' released Lorimer who moved to the Shawsheen Indians for the start of the 1925-1926 season. After twenty games, the Indians sent him to the New Bedford Whalers. Lorimer's lack of discipline followed him and in January 1927, he was fined $50 and suspended for hitting a spectator during a league game. In 1928, New Bedford sent Lorimer to J&P Coats. He returned to New Bedford in 1929 and finished his career with them.
