= Bill Westwater =

Scottish footballer

Personal information
- Place of birth: Edinburgh, Scotland
- Date of death: 16 March 1987
- Place of death: Burlington, Ontario, Canada
- Position: Inside forward

Senior career*
Years	Team	Apps	(Gls)
1918–1922	Hearts		
1922	Toronto All Scots		
1924	Montréal Carsteel FC		
1924–1925	New Bedford Whalers	17	(12)
1925–1926	Boston Soccer Club	20	(10)
1926–1927	Montréal Carsteel FC		
1928	Montreal CNR		
- * Club domestic league appearances and goals

Bill Westwater was an early twentieth-century Scottish footballer who played in Scotland, Canada and the United States.

In 1922, Westwater moved to Canada, spending one season with the Toronto All Scots before moving to Montreal Carsteel. In 1924, he played in the American Soccer League with New Bedford Whalers, and the following season with Boston Soccer Club. After several seasons abroad he returned to play with former team Montréal Carsteel FC in 1926 and later with Montreal CNR in the National Soccer League.
