= Neil Turner (footballer) =

Scottish footballer

Personal information
- Full name: Neil McDougall Turner
- Date of birth: 12 October 1891
- Place of birth: Govan, Scotland
- Date of death: January 1981 (aged 89)
- Place of death: Massachusetts, United States
- Position: Outside right

Youth career
- Petershill

Senior career*
Years	Team	Apps	(Gls)
- Petershill
1913–1914	Leeds City	4	(2)
1914–1916	Raith Rovers	59	(12)
1917–1918	St Mirren	11	(4)
1918	→ Vale of Leven (loan)		
1918–1919	Kilmarnock	9	(5)
1919	Sunderland	1	(0)
1920	Aberdare Athletic	22	(2)
1922–1923	Dundee	8	(0)
1923–1925	Bethlehem Steel	43	(17)
1925–1926	New Bedford Whalers	32	(14)
1926–1927	Springfield Babes	21	(6)
- * Club domestic league appearances and goals

Neil McDougall Turner (10 October 1891 – January 1971) was a Scottish footballer who played in the English Football League, Scottish Football League and the American Soccer League as a forward.

== Career ==
Born in Glasgow, Scotland, Turner played for Petershill as a youth player. In September 1913, he moved to Leeds City. In August 1914, Leeds sent Turner to Raith Rovers. During World War I, he played as a guest with Benburb F.C. At some point, he joined Vale of Leven before moving to Kilmarnock in September 1918. He also played for Aberdare Athletic and Sunderland.

In October 1923, Turner joined Bethlehem Steel of the American Soccer League. In 1925, he moved to the New Bedford Whalers before finishing his career with the Springfield Babes during the 1926–1927 season.
