= Malcolm Goldie =

Soccer player (born 1893)

Personal information
- Full name: Malcolm Livingstone Goldie
- Date of birth: 3 September 1893
- Place of birth: Duntocher, Scotland
- Date of death: 17 September 1963 (aged 70)
- Place of death: Hull, Massachusetts, United States
- Position: Outside left

Senior career*
Years	Team	Apps	(Gls)
1912–1918	Clyde	11	(1)
1913–1914	→ St Bernard's (loan)	17	(5)
1914–1915	→ Clydebank (loan)	25	(14)
1917–1918	→ Clydebank (loan)	21	(7)
1918–1922	Clydebank	126	(23)
1922–1928	Bethlehem Steel	199	(52)
1928–1929	Fall River	62	(9)
1929	Pawtucket Rangers	15	(2)
1930	New Bedford Whalers	1	(0)

International career
1925	United States	1	(0)

Managerial career
- 1933–1941: MIT
- * Club domestic league appearances and goals

Malcolm Livingstone Goldie (3 September 1893 – 17 September 1963) was a soccer player who played as an outside left. He began his career in Scotland before moving to American Soccer League in 1922. Born in Scotland, he earned one cap for the United States national team in 1925. He also coached the MIT soccer team from 1933 to 1941.

== Playing career ==
=== Scotland ===
Goldie was born on 3 September 1893. He began his professional career with Scottish Football League clubs Clyde, St Bernard's and latterly Clydebank. At the time the club played in the Second Division, but during World War I, the loss of players to the military led to the disbandment of the lower division and Clydebank played in the Western League. However, in 1917 they were invited into the remaining top division (in place of clubs which had withdrawn due to wartime travel difficulties) where they remained until relegated following the 1921–22 season. At that point, Goldie left the club and moved to the United States where he signed with Bethlehem Steel of the American Soccer League (ASL).

=== ASL ===
In 1922, Goldie began his U.S. career with Bethlehem Steel. At the time, Steel was one of the top U.S. clubs and Goldie remained with them until 1928. Throughout his six seasons in Bethlehem, he was acknowledged as one of the top wingers in the ASL. However, he suffered from numerous injuries which frequently put him on the sidelines for weeks at a time. In 1926, Goldie and the Steelmen won the National Challenge Cup over the St. Louis Soccer League team Ben Millers with Goldie scoring one of Bethlehem's goals. In 1927, Goldie added a league title to go with the Challenge Cup. In August 1928, Bethlehem agreed to transfer Goldie to the Fall River for $400.00, half to be paid immediately and half to be paid at a future date. However, Fall River failed to pay the transfer amount as the league suspended Bethlehem Steel as part of the "Soccer Wars". Goldie spent the 1928-1929 and 1929 fall season in Fall River. However, he played only two games of the 1929–1930 season with them before moving to the Pawtucket Rangers. He played fifteen games for Pawtucket before moving to the New Bedford Whalers for one game.

=== National team ===
Goldie earned one cap with the U.S. national team in a 6–1 win over Canada on 8 November 1925.

== Coaching career ==
In 1933, Goldie was hired as the head coach of the men's soccer team at MIT. He broke a vertebra in his back during the summer of 1940 which made it difficult for him to coach the team. He ultimately retired and in April 1941, John Craig replaced him as head coach.

== Death ==
Goldie died on 17 September 1963, in Hull, Massachusetts, United States.

== See also ==
- List of United States men's international soccer players born outside the United States
