= Jock Rattray =

Scottish footballer

Personal information
- Full name: John Campbell Rattray
- Date of birth: 14 October 1890
- Place of birth: Lumphinnans, Scotland
- Date of death: 1958 (aged 67–68)
- Place of death: Kirkcaldy, Scotland
- Positions: Inside right; right half

Senior career*
Years	Team	Apps	(Gls)
1911–1913	Falkirk	37	(15)
1913–1917	Raith Rovers	95	(22)
1915–1916	→ Ayr United (loan)	8	(1)
1918–1919	Dumbarton	1	(0)
1919–1922	Raith Rovers	73	(5)
1922–1924	Bethlehem Steel	34	(10)

Managerial career
- 1923–1924: Bethlehem Steel
- 1928–1930: TSV Lyra
- * Club domestic league appearances and goals

John Campbell Rattray (14 October 1890 – 1958) was an early twentieth-century Scottish football inside forward who played professionally in Scotland and the United States.

== Playing career ==
=== Scotland ===
Rattray was born in Lumphinnans, Fife, Scotland. In February 1910 he began his professional career with Falkirk of the Scottish Football League First Division. He spent two full seasons at Falkirk before transferring to Raith Rovers in 1913, but his career was interrupted, along with so many others, by the outbreak of World War I in 1914. Rattray served along with other footballers in McCrae's Battalion of the Royal Scots during the war, not returning to football until January 1919 when he signed with Dumbarton. He then moved back to Raith Rovers for three more years. In recognition of his service to the Kirkcaldy club he was awarded a benefit match, which was played against a Fifeshire Select on 4 January 1921.

=== United States ===
In 1922, Rattray left Scotland to sign with the Bethlehem Steel of the American Soccer League. His last game with the team came in the final of the 1924 American Cup. He was not slated to start the game, but was written in to fill in for an injured teammate. His selection paid dividends when he scored the game's only goal, giving Steel its sixth American Cup title. At the time it was said of him:

When actively engaged in the sport Rattray was one of the versatile type of players. He was equally effective on the halfback line as he was among the forwards, and frequently alternated in the positions of right halfback and inside right.

Rattray retired following the 1923–1924 season, returning to Scotland where he settled in Cowdenbeath.

== Coaching career ==
In 1928 he went for two years to Belgium as coach for second division team TSV Lyra.

== Honours ==
Bethlehem Steel

- American Cup: 1924
- American Soccer League Runners-up: 1923–24
