= Centennial F.C. =

Centennial F.C. also known as Philadelphia Centennials, was an early twentieth century amateur U.S. soccer team based in Philadelphia, Pennsylvania.

== History ==
In 1910, Centennial won the Philadelphia Amateur Challenge Cup. Two years later it was the champion of Philadelphia’s St. George League. The next mention of Centennial F.C. came when it entered the 1928-29 Eastern Professional Soccer League and was eliminated in the first round of the 1928 National Challenge Cup.
