= Eastern Professional Soccer League (1928–29) =

American soccer league

The Eastern Professional Soccer League, better known as the Eastern Soccer League (ESL), was an American soccer league which existed for only a season and a half in 1928 and 1929. Born of the internecine strife between soccer organizations in the United States known as the “Soccer War”, the ESL was created by the United States Football Association (USFA) as a counter to the professional American Soccer League which was contesting USFA control of professional soccer in the country.

== History ==
=== Background ===
The Eastern Professional Soccer League was created in response to an attempt by the American Soccer League to break the control of the United States Football Association over professional soccer in the U.S. This conflict, known as the “Soccer War”, had its roots in 1925 when the ASL boycotted the National Challenge Cup, now known as the U.S. Open Cup, in order to play a one time American Professional Soccer Championship with the St. Louis Soccer League. This led the USFA to briefly suspend the ASL, only to reinstate them when the league agreed to allow its teams to enter the next Challenge Cup. The ASL caused more problems for USFA in 1927 when the league signed numerous top European players to lucrative contracts. This led FIFA to consider suspending USFA. However, at the Sixteenth Annual Congress of FIFA, the USFA offered several concessions which led to an agreement among national organizations regarding player contracts. In 1928, several ASL team owners began to chafe again under USFA rules. The most vexing was the requirement to enter the National Challenge Cup which ran during the league’s season. The ASL had two main objections to the Challenge Cup, one financial, the other scheduling. As the cup was open to all teams registered with USFA, ASL teams found themselves playing unknown amateur and semi-professional opponents before non-paying crowds. These games also interfered with the league’s schedule. As a result, the ASL decided to boycott the 1928 cup. Three of the ASL teams, Bethlehem Steel, Newark Skeeters and New York Giants chose to enter the cup. On September 24, 1928, the ASL suspended the three teams and fined each $1000. On October 2, 1928, USFA suspended the ASL and designated it an “outlaw league”. The USFA then brokered the creation of a new league, to be called the Eastern Professional Soccer League. To fill in the league, the USFA induced several teams from the Southern New York Soccer Association (SNYSA) to leave that league. That led the SNYSA, under the leadership of new president Nat Agar, who was also the owner of the Brooklyn Wanderers of the ASL, to leave the USFA and ally itself with the ASL.

=== Origin ===
The Eastern Professional Soccer League began officially on October 8, 1928 when the league officially incorporated and elected officers at the Cornish Arms Hotel in New York City. The league’s officer were Captain E. W. Whitwell, president; Levi P. Wilcox, first vice president; Joseph J. Barriskill, second vice president; Alan W. Cahill, treasure; James Armstrong, secretary. A. W. Cahill was not related to Thomas Cahill, secretary of the United States Football Association. The league comprised eight teams, the three expelled ASL teams, four teams from the Southern New York Football Association: New York Hispano, New York Celtics, Philadelphia Centennials and IRT Rangers; and one newly created team, New York Hakoah.

=== 1928–29 season ===
The 1928–29 season ran from the fall of 1928 to the spring of 1929 with a mid winter break. By the end of the first half, only the New York Giants and New York Hakoah had played all eighteen games. New York Celtic had dropped out after eight games and the rest of the teams had played either fourteen or fifteen games. Bethlehem Steel led the league with twenty-eight points off 14-1-0 record. The second half of the season began with a different line up than the first half. Celtic, as already mentioned, had dropped out. New York Hungaria joined the league from the Southern New York Soccer Association and the New Bedford Whalers joined from the ASL. The Whalers lasted only eight games before returning to the ASL. The Skeeters played nine games then also dropped out. At the end of the spring half, Bethlehem led the league with 49 points, taking the league championship.

=== 1929 season ===
The league’s second season, began on September 2, 1929. By this time, the financial losses suffered by the ASL, SNYSA and ESL had begun to mount. With the stock market crash a month later, the corporate sponsorship on which many of the teams depended began to dry up. Consequently, the ASL began negotiations with the USFA to rejoin the association. This led to additional negotiations regarding the merger of the ASL and ESL. As these went on, the ESL began its 1929-1930 season. By the end of the first half in November 1929, Bethlehem Steel led the standings with twenty-three points off an 11-2-1 record.

== End of the league ==
On November 4, 1929, the USFA, ASL and ESL came to an agreement regarding an end to the Soccer War. The ASL and ESL would merge to create a league to be known as the Atlantic Coast Soccer League. The ESL therefore suspended its season, declared Bethlehem Steel the champion and began negotiations for the upcoming merger.

== Champions ==
- 1928–29: Bethlehem Steel
- Fall 1929: Bethlehem Steel

== Teams ==
- Bethlehem Steel 1928–29, fall 1929
- New York Giants 1928–29, fall 1929
- New York Hakoah 1928–29, fall 1929
- Newark Skeeters 1928–29, fall 1929
- IRT Rangers 1928–29, fall 1929
- Philadelphia Centennials 1928–29
- New York Hispano 1928–29, fall 1929
- New York Celtics 1928
- New York Hungaria Spring 1929; as Victoria Hungaria in fall 1929
- New Bedford Whalers Spring 1929
- Newark Portuguese Fall 1929
