= 1923–24 American Cup =

Soccer tournament

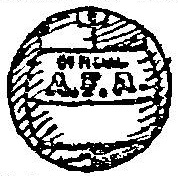

Tournament details
- Country: United States
- Dates: October 1923 – May 1924
- Teams: 43

Final positions
- Champions: Bethlehem Steel (6th title)
- Runners-up: Fall River

The 1923–24 American Cup was the thirty–second edition of the annual challenge cup held by the American Football Association. The Secretary of the AFA, Andrew Beveridge received entries up to September 29, 1923.

== Preliminary round ==
Matches were due to be completed by October 28, 1923. The following teams drew byes for this round: Abbot Worsted (Forge Village), Bethlehem Steel, Brooklyn, Crompton, Fairhill (Philadelphia), Fairlawn Rovers (Pawtucket), Falco (Holyoke), Fall River, Fleischer Yarn (Philadelphia), Fore River (Quincy), General Electric United (Lynn), J. & P. Coats (Pawtucket), Morell Mills (Philadelphia), National Giants (NY), New York, Newark, Philadelphia, Prospect Hill (Pawtucket), Sayles Finishing (Pawtucket), West End Polish (Crompton), and Weypoyset.

Northern Massachusetts

October 27, 1923

Ludlow Thistle	1–3	Ludlow Wanderers
Munroe		F. Souza; Maia; Oliveira

Whitney St. Park, Ludlow, MA
Referee: Goodwin
October 28, 1923

Pacific Mills	3–1	Swedish American
Rodgers; White; Ormond		Neelgram

Pacific Field, Lawrence, MA
Referee: R. Ritchie

Southern New England

October 1923

Greystone Blues	–	Don Carlos

Providence, RI
October 21, 1923

Greystone Vets	1–1	Providence Thistle

Centredale Oval

replay

October 28, 1923

Greystone Vets	–	Providence Thistle

Centredale Oval

Connecticut and New York

November 4, 1923

Ansonia	2–1	Campbell
Duncan (2)		30' Berwick

Hotchkiss Field, Ansonia, CT
Referee: J. Miller (New Haven)
November 5, 1923

Bedford	4–0	Danersk Athletics
Avery; Rew (3)

Commercial Field, Brooklyn
Referee: W. Hollywood

New Jersey District

October 21, 1923

General Electric	0–2	American A.A.
		T. Strong (2)

Bloomfield, NJ
Referee: J. Hays
October 28, 1923

Bayonne Rovers	3–1	Jersey A.C.
Elliott; Carr; 80' Callahan		Perrini

City Park, Bayonne
October 28, 1923

Hudson	4–0	British War Veterans
C. Cavanaugh; 60' R. Norris; Koss; McLoughlin

Montgomery Park, Weehawken
Referee: J. Hayes
October 28, 1923

Clan MacLeod	3–3	Clan McKay
McCrum; O'Neil; Hill		50' Boyle; Speed; Lees

Marion Oval, Jersey City
Referee: Andrew Lawrie

replay

November 4, 1923

Clan MacLeod	5–3	Clan McKay
Bell (4); McPherson		Boyle; Brennan; Cowie

Marion Oval, Jersey City
Referee: Andrew Laurie

Pennsylvania District

October 27, 1923

Viscose	7–1	36th Ward
Chew (2); Murphy (2); Bennett (2); J. Nicol		Smith

Marcus Hook, PA
Referee: George Young

== First round ==
Matches were due to be completed by November 25, 1923. The Fore River–G.E. United match was called on account of rain after one half and was replayed on Thanksgiving Day.

Northern Section

November 24, 1923

Ludlow Wanderers	0–7	Pacific Mills
		Churchley (3); Kershaw (3); Lyons

Whitney Park, Ludlow, MA
Referee: Carstairs
November 24, 1923

Fore River	2–1	General Electric United
10' Satterwaite; Harrison		Duthie

Fore River Field, Quincy
Referee: W.R. Welch (Boston)
November 25, 1923

Greystone Vets	–	Crompton

Centredale Oval
November 29, 1923

Fall River	7–1	West End Polish
Harold Brittan (4); Harry McGowan (2); Campbell		Frank Begos

Mark's Stadium, Tiverton, RI
Attendance: 2200
Referee: Joe Smith (Fall River)
November 29, 1923

Sayles Finishing	2–0	Waypoyset
50', 2H' Bennie Wilson

Sayles Field, Providence, RI
Attendance: 2000
Referee: S. Morris (Greystone)
November 29, 1923

J. & P. Coats	2–1	Fairlawn Rovers
3' McLeavey; Neilson		Sandeman (pk)

Coats Field, Pawtucket
Attendance: 1800
Referee: Odell
November 29, 1923

Falco	2–6	Abbot Worsted
Veighey; Brown		3' Neil; Bob Perry (4); Farquhar

Falco Field, Holyoke, MA
Referee: J. Goodwin
December 9, 1923

Prospect Hill	9–1	Don Carlos
Cookson (3); White; McCaughey; T. Littleford (3); Withers		Hayes

John St. grounds, Lonsdale, RI
Referee: Rose

replay

November 29, 1923

Fore River	2–1	General Electric United
Joe Black (2)		Duthie

Fore River Field, Quincy
Referee: W.R. Welch (Boston)

Southern Section

November 24, 1923

Philadelphia	1–2	Bethlehem Steel
40' Braidford		Alec Jackson; Walter Jackson

Philadelphia, PA
Referee: McCabe
November 24, 1923

Viscose	0–2	Fairhill
		Farrell; Hamilton

Marcus Hook, PA
Referee: Robert Scott
November 24, 1923

Morrell Mills	1–3	Fleisher Yarn
W. Flynn		Straddon (2); Galloway

Philadelphia, PA
November 25, 1923

Clan MacLeod	2–1	Hudson
G. Carnegie; 80' Hartie		Reich (pk)

Marion Oval, Jersey City
Referee: James Hayes
November 25, 1923

Ansonia	1–4	Bedford
40' McKenzie (pk)		Gallagher; Adamson; 75', 85' Kerr

Hotchkiss Field, Ansonia
Referee: Andy York (Torrington)
December 9, 1923

National Giants	2–3	New York
Reynolds (og); 60', 80' Peter Sweeney		75' Duggan; Bart McGhee

Polo grounds,
Attendance: 5000
Referee: James Masterton (Brooklyn
December 16, 1923

Bayonne Rovers	0–3	American A.A.
		75' Tommie Strong; Andie Hutchinson; Dick Porter

City Park, Bayonne
Referee: J. Hayes
January 20, 1924

Brooklyn Wanderers	4–2	Newark
8' Docherty; 11' Curtis; 13' Hogg; 50' Cosgrove		1H' Bleich; 65' Heminsley

Wanderers Field, Brooklyn
Referee: Tom Cunningham

== Second round ==
Matches were due to be completed by January 20, 1924. Prospect Hill forfeited their match with Fore River.

Northern section

January 1, 1924

Fall River	2–0	Sayles Finishing
35' Johnny Reid; McPherson

Mark's Stadium, Tiverton, RI
Attendance: 2000
Referee: William Norse (New Bedford)
January 12, 1924

J. & P. Coats	1–2	Crompton
Fleming		8' Baronne; 82' Read

Lonsdale ground, Pawtucket
Attendance: 1500
Referee: Odell
January 26, 1924

Fore River	w/o	Prospect Hill

Quincy, MA
February 2, 1924

Abbot Worsted	4–0	Pacific Mills
Cummings; Farquhar; Perry; Dundas

Forge Village, MA
Referee: Patrick Darcy (Lawrence)

Southern section

January 13, 1924

Bedford	1–6	Bethlehem Steel
75' Donelly		Alec Jackson (3); Walter Jackson; McGregor; Maxwell

New York Oval
Attendance: 3000
Referee: J. Hayes
January 20, 1924

Clan MacLeod	1–5	American A.A.
P. Hartie		J. Durkin; Tommy Strong (2); T. Florie; A. Hutchison

Marion Oval, Jersey City
Referee: J. Hays
January 12, 1924

Fleisher Yarn	1–0	Fairhill
80' Galloway

Philadelphia, PA
Referee: R. McCabe
February 3, 1924

New York	2–0	Brooklyn Wanderers
53' Archie Stark; 81' Duggan

New York Oval
Attendance: 5000
Referee: Edward McCabe (Philadelphia)

== Third round ==
Northern section

February 3, 1924

Fall River	6–2	Crompton
Fred Morley (2); Tom Raeside (2); Johnny Reid (2)		35' Cullerton; Simone (pk)

Mark's Stadium, Tiverton, RI
Referee: Carroll (Greystone)
February 23, 1924

Abbot Worsted	2–0	Fore River
41' Perry; 42' Neil

Forge Village, MA
Referee: George Lambie (Newton)

Southern section

March 22, 1924

Fleisher Yarn	1–3	Bethlehem Steel
86' Straddan		Walter Jackson (2); Granger

Fleisher Park, Philadelphia, PA
Attendance: 5000
Referee: George Young
March 23, 1924

New York	2–1	American A.A.
2H', 115' Archie Stark		30' Tommie Strong

New York Oval
Attendance: 4000
Referee: J. Duggan

== Semifinals ==
April 19, 1924

Fall River	4–1	Abbot Worsted
27' McPherson (pk); 109', 113' Harold Brittan; 114' Morley		75' Dundas

Coats Field, Pawtucket, RI
Attendance: 5120
Referee: Robert Carroll (Greystone)
April 20, 1924

New York	0–1	Bethlehem Steel
		75' Walter Jackson

New York Oval
Attendance: 5000
Referee: D. Oates (Philadelphia)

== Final ==

The final took place on May 11, 1924 at the Jersey City baseball grounds. Bethlehem Steel, by their victory, broke up a near treble by Fall River who had previously won the National Challenge Cup in March and finished first in the American Soccer League which wrapped up in June. For their part, Bethlehem Steel was a semifinalist in the National Cup and finished second in the ASL.

May 11, 1924

Bethlehem Steel	1–0	Fall River F.C.
37' Jack Rattray

International League park, Jersey City, New Jersey
Attendance: 3000
Referee: William F. Fraser (Paterson)

== See also ==
- 1923–24 American Soccer League
- 1923–24 National Challenge Cup
- 1924 National Amateur Cup
