= Fleisher Yarn =

American soccer team

- Founded: 1919
- Dissolved: 1925
- League: American Soccer League
- 1924–25: 10th

Fleisher Yarn began as an amateur company soccer club of the S.B. & B.W. Fleisher Manufacturing Company in Philadelphia. Feisher Yarn became a professional team for the 1924-25 American Soccer League season. The team folded after one year in the league.

== History ==
Around 1919, S.B. & B.W. Fleisher Manufacturing Company started a soccer team that quickly became a national amateur soccer power. They won the Philadelphia Industrial League championship in 1920/21, both the Allied Amateur Cup of Philadelphia and Philadelphia's Telegraph Cup in 1922, a "quadruple" in 1923 winning the Allied Amateur League, the Allied Amateur League Cup, the Allied Amateur Cup, and the American Cup (the last by defeating the professional J&P Coats of the American Soccer League), and the inaugural National Amateur Cup.

Fleisher became a professional team and joined the American Soccer League in 1924. After one mediocre season the club folded.

== Year-by-year ==
Year	Division	League	Reg. Season	Playoffs	Cup
1920–21	Amateur	Philadelphia Industrial League Championship	1st		DNE
1921–22	Amateur				Allied Amateur Cup of Philadelphia – Champions; Telegraph Cup (Philadelphia) – Champions
1922–23	Amateur	Allied Amateur League	1st	Champions	Allied Amateur Cup – Champions; American Cup – Champions
1923–24	Amateur				National Amateur Cup
1924-25	1	American Soccer League	10th	DNE	
