= Newark Skeeters =

American soccer club

The Newark Skeeters was an American soccer club based in Newark, New Jersey and was a member of the American Soccer League and the Eastern Soccer League.

== History ==
In December 1924, Tom Adam, former manager of West Hudson A.A., became the manager of the Skeeters. In 1928, the American Soccer League suspended Newark when the team defied the league's boycott of the National Challenge Cup. The Skeeters then joined two other ASL teams, Bethlehem Steel and the New York Giants, in the newly created Eastern Professional Soccer League. The club folded upon the merger of the ASL and ESL after the fall 1929 season.

== Year-by-year ==
Year	Division	League	Reg. season	Playoffs	U.S. Open Cup
1923/24	1	ASL	8th	No playoff	Quarterfinals
1924/25	1	ASL	11th	No playoff	Did not enter
1925/26	1	ASL	12th	No playoff	First round
1926/27	1	ASL	10th	No playoff	Quarterfinals
1927/28	1	ASL	9th (1st half); 10th (2nd half)	Did not qualify	First round
1928/29	1	ASL	withdrew after 7 games	N/A	N/A
1928-29	N/A	ESL	4th (1st half); 9th (2nd half)	No playoff	Quarterfinal
1929	N/A	ESL	7th	No playoff	N/A
