= Brooklyn Wanderers =

American soccer team

- Full name: Brooklyn Wanderers Football Club
- Founded: 1890s
- Dissolved: c. 1950
- Stadium: Brooklyn
- League: ASL
colors

The Brooklyn Wanderers was a U.S. soccer team which was a founding member of the National Association Football League in the late nineteenth century. Later versions joined the original American Soccer League and the reorganized American Soccer League.

== Brooklyn Wanderers (1895–1899, 1912–1913) ==
=== History ===
In December 1894 the Wanderers were a key part of the formation of the National Association Football League. The league suspended operations in 1899. The team's competitive record then becomes difficult to follow as it appears to have operated as an independent club. In September 1901, it lost to the Bayonne Rangers during a Labor Day sports carnival. In 1906, a member of the Wanderers acted as a referee in a game between Critchleys and Brooklyn Thistle. This rare reference to the Wanderers is significant in that Critchley's outside right Nat Agar (listed as Agot) later owned the Wanderers. In 1912, the Wanderers rejoined the NAFBL, but withdrew only six games into the season. Several of the players then jumped to Brooklyn F.C.

=== Year-by-year ===
Year	Division	League	Reg. season	National Cup
1895	N/A	NAFBL	3rd	N/A
1895/96	N/A	NAFBL	?	N/A
1896/97	N/A	NAFBL	?	N/A
1897/98	N/A	NAFBL	6th	N/A
1898/99	N/A	NAFBL	DNF (Note: League folded and season was not completed)	N/A
1912/13	N/A	NAFBL	Withdrew (Note: Wanderers disbanded and folded into Brooklyn F.C.)	N/A

== Brooklyn Wanderers (1922–1931) ==
=== History ===
In 1922, the Bay Ridge F.C. fielded two clubs that fall. One continued under the Bay Ridge F.C. name in the First Division of the amateur New York State Association Football League and another was a reorganized Brooklyn Wanderers F.C. that was created to play in the newly-formed semi-pro New Jersey State Soccer League. The home pitch for both teams was Hawthorne Field.

The Wanderers played a handful of games in the New Jersey State League and three National Challenge Cup matches from mid-September through the first week of November in 1922. Then, on November 12 at a special meeting of the American Soccer League, the Wanderers were admitted (a month into the season) as the league's eighth club, belatedly replacing the Todd Shipyards F.C. that had left the league and disbanded during the off-season.

During its years in the ASL, the Wanderers played at Hawthorne Field, a dedicated soccer stadium owned by Agar. In 1926, Béla Guttmann briefly played for the team. After the 1925/26 ASL season the Wanderers, the Boston Soccer Club and the New Bedford Whalers joined with four top Canadian clubs to form the one-off International Soccer League held that summer and early fall. The Wanderers won the season championship, but lost to Toronto Ulster United in the final of the league's Nathan Strauss Cup.

The Wanderers folded after the 1931 Spring season, the first half of the ASL 1931 season.

=== Year-by-year ===
Year	Division	League	Reg. season	Playoffs	National Cup
1922/23	1	ASL	6th	No playoff	First round
1923/24	1	ASL	5th	No playoff	Third round
1924/25	1	ASL	3rd	No playoff	did not enter
1925/26	1	ASL	7th	No playoff	Second round
1926	N/A	ISL	1st	Champion (no playoff)	N/A
1926/27	1	ASL	7th	No playoff	Third round
1927/28	1	ASL	4th (1st half); 8th (2nd half)	did not qualify	Quarterfinals
1928/29	1	ASL	2nd (1st half); 5th (2nd half)	No playoff	?
Fall 1929	1	ASL	7th	No playoff	N/A
1930	1	ACL/ASL	9th (Spring); 7th (Fall)	No playoff	Third round
1931	1	ASL	2nd (Spring)	No playoff	N/A

== Brooklyn Wanderers (1932–1933) ==
The third Brooklyn Wanderers was also a member of the American Soccer League.

The club joined the league before the fall 1932 season and stayed through the disintegration of the league in the spring of 1933.

=== Year-by-year ===
Year	Division	League	Reg. season	Playoffs	National Cup
Fall 1932	1	ASL	5th	No playoff	N/A
Spring 1933	1	ASL	?	?	First round

== Brooklyn Wanderers (1942–1949) ==
The fourth Brooklyn Wanderers was a member of the reformed American Soccer League.

Suffering financial trouble, the franchise was bought by the owners of Hakoah A.C. two games into the 1948/49 season. Hakoah left the National League to join the ASL and carried on from the Wanderers' loss and tie.

=== Year-by-year ===
Year	Division	League	Reg. season	Playoffs	National Cup
1942/43	N/A	ASL	4th	No playoff	?
1943/44	N/A	ASL	2nd	No playoff	?
1944/45	N/A	ASL	3rd	No playoff	?
1945/46	N/A	ASL	4th	No playoff	?
1946/47	N/A	ASL	2nd	No playoff	?
1947/48	N/A	ASL	3rd	No playoff	?
1948/49	N/A	ASL	Played two games	N/A	N/A
