= 1930 American Soccer League =

American Soccer League -1930 Season-
- Season: 1930
- Champions: Fall River F.C. (6th title)
- Lewis Cup: Fall River F.C.
- Top goalscorer: Jerry Best (52)

Statistics of American Soccer League in season 1930.

== Overview ==
In 1928, a dispute broke out between the American Soccer League and the United States Football Association regarding participation in the National Challenge Cup. The League decided to boycott the cup, but three teams, Bethlehem Steel, the Newark Skeeters and the New York Giants all entered the competition. When the league suspended the three teams, the USFA offered to bankroll the creation of a new league, the Eastern Professional Soccer League. This new league included the three ex-American Soccer League teams, four teams from the Southern New York Football Association and one newly created team, New York Hakoah. By the fall of 1929, the onset of the Great Depression and the competition between the ASL and EPSL had created significant financial problems for both leagues and the USFA. Consequently, the USFA and the two leagued came to an agreement to end the dispute on October 9, 1929. The two leagues entered into discussions to merge. By the first week of November 1929, the merger was complete with the new league taking the name of the Atlantic Coast Soccer League. The new league decided to run a two-part 1930 season. Oddly enough, they decided to play the first games of the 1930 season during the weekend of November 6, 1929. The first half of the season ended the last weekend of April 1930. During the summer of 1930, the league resumed the name American Soccer League, beginning the second half of the season in September and ending the first weekend of January 1931. Although the league attempted to continue operations as it had before the dispute with the USFA, it began to fail during the 1930 season. The dispute between the ASL and USFA financially weakened the league and its teams. The onset of the Great Depression in 1929 further exacerbated these problems. This resulted in significant changes in the lineup of teams in the league.

=== Team turmoil ===
Boston became the first team to fail, leaving the league and disbanding after only four games. The second team to fail was one which had just entered the ASL, Bridgeport Hungaria. Based in Bridgeport, Pennsylvania, the team moved to Newark, New Jersey after ten games, played another five in Newark, then withdrew from the league and disbanded. During the mid-season break, Bethlehem Steel F.C. withdrew and disbanded. Then, the New York Giants renamed themselves the New York Soccer Club. The New York Nationals immediately took the name Giants.

=== Champions ===
The Fall River Football Club finished top of the table in both the first and second half. The league saw no need for a playoff and declared the 'Marksmen' champions. The 'Marksmen' also won the league (Lewis) cup and the 1929–30 National Challenge Cup, giving it a domestic treble. Having achieved this distinction, the 'Marksmen' promptly withdrew from the league and merged with the New York Soccer Club to form the New York Yankees for the 1931 season.

== League standings ==
=== First half (Atlantic Coast Soccer League) ===
Place	Team	GP	W	L	D	GF	GA	Pts	Pct
1	Fall River F.C.	27	19	1	7	84	40	44	.814
2	New Bedford Whalers	33	12	10	11	56	50	35	.530
3	Hakoah All Stars	33	14	12	7	65	61	35	.530
4	Providence	27	12	11	4	53	56	28	.519
5	New York Nationals	33	14	14	5	88	89	33	.500
6	Pawtucket Rangers	28	10	11	7	50	61	27	.483
7	Bethlehem Steel	27	11	12	4	66	54	26	.481
8	New York Giants	30	11	13	6	67	77	28	.467
9	Brooklyn Wanderers	32	9	13	10	63	66	28	.438
10	Bridgeport Hungaria/Newark (Note: Bridgeport played ten games in Bridgeport, then moved the Newark, New Jersey where they played five games before withdrawing from the league.)	15	0	12	3	21	59	3	.100
11	Boston (Note: Boston withdrew from the league after four games.)	4	1	0	3	5	9	2	.250

=== Second half (American Soccer League) ===
Place	Team	GP	W	L	D	GF	GA	Pts	Pct
1	Fall River F.C.	27	13	8	6	54	43	34	.630
2	New Bedford Whalers	30	15	6	9	75	62	36	.600
3	Hakoah All-Stars	27	10	8	9	40	42	28	.519
4	Newark Americans (Note: The Newark Americans entered the league mid-season and did not play in the first half.)	28	11	6	11	62	55	28	.500
5	New York Soccer Club (Giants) (Note: Team played as the New York Giants in the first half.)	27	12	3	12	51	55	27	.500
6	Providence	29	12	3	14	46	29	27	.466
7	Brooklyn Wanderers	30	10	7	13	57	58	27	.450
8	New York Giants (Nationals) (Note: Team played as the New York Nationals in the first half.)	31	9	7	15	64	86	27	.435
9	Pawtucket Rangers	31	0	8	14	54	26	26	.419

== League Cup ==
The winners of the League Cup final were awarded the H.E. Lewis Cup. Hakoah All-Stars and New York Nationals were forced to play a replay on May 22, 1930, to determine a winner after the first two matches ended in draws, and neither side scored in 30 minutes of extra time at the end of the second match.

The first game of the two-game final was originally scheduled for May 25, 1930, but was cancelled due to rain. It took place at night at a neutral site, the Polo Grounds in New York, two days later. The second game of the final was then scheduled for May 28, but rain forced its cancellation as well. The game was continually rescheduled until it was finally played on October 23, 1930.

=== Bracket ===
May 10–22; 2-legged aggregate & *match replay
MA	Fall River F.C.	1	3	4
RI	Pawtucket Rangers	1	1	2
NY	Hakoah All-Stars	2	1(2)	5
NY	New York Nationals	2	1(1)	4

May 27 and October 23; 2-legged aggregate
MA	Fall River F.C.	2	3	5
NY	Hakoah All-Stars	1	0	1

=== Final ===
Team 1	Aggregate	Team 2	First leg	Second leg	Attendance
Fall River F.C.	5–1	Hakoah All-Stars	2–1	3–0	May 27 • Polo Grounds • 5,000; October 23 • Polo Grounds • 2,500

==== First leg ====
May 27, 1930

Fall River F.C.	2–1	Hakoah All-Stars
Billy Gonsalves 4'; Werner Nilsen 70'	Report	Siegfried Wortmann

The Polo Grounds, New York, New York
Attendance: 5,000
Referee: Ed McCabe

==== Second leg ====
October 23, 1930
8:15 PM EST

Hakoah All-Stars	0–3	Fall River F.C.
	Report	, Billy Gonsalves; Arnie Oliver

The Polo Grounds, New York, New York
Attendance: 2,500
Referee: Ed McCabe

Fall River F.C. won Lewis Cup, 5–1, on aggregate.

== Goals leaders ==
Rank	Scorer	Club	Games	Goals
1	Jerry Best	Pawtucket Rangers; Fall River F.C. New Bedford Whalers	49	52
2	John Nelson	New York Nationals	42	45
3	Bert Patenaude	Fall River F.C. Newark Americans	44	44
4	Archie Stark	Bethlehem Steel; Newark Americans	38	40
5	Bill Paterson	Providence; New Bedford Whalers	44	38
6	Billy Gonsalves	Fall River F.C.	53	35
7	Werner Nilsen	Boston; Fall River F.C.	51	27
8	Bob McIntyre	Pawtucket Rangers	31	23
8	Davey Brown	New York Giants	50	23
8	Josef Grünfeld	Hakoah All-Stars	56	23
11	Tommy Florie	New Bedford Whalers	59	22
12	Siegfried Wortmann	Hakoah All-Stars	50	20
12	Jimmy Gallagher	New York Nationals; New York Giants	64	20
14	Bobby Yule	Brooklyn Wanderers	49	19
15	Janos Nehadoma	Brooklyn Wanderers	32	18
16	Herbert Carlsson	New York Nationals; New York Giants	46	17
16	Bart McGhee	New York Nationals; New York Giants	58	17
18	James Brown	New York Giants; New York Soccer Club	38	16
18	Red Ballantyne	New York Giants; Brooklyn Wanderers	49	16
20	Max Grünwald	Hakoah All-Stars	52	15
21	Tec White	Fall River F.C.	50	14
21	Moritz Häusler	Hakoah All-Stars	56	14
23	Jimmie Baillie	New York Soccer Club	26	13
23	Billy Oswald	Providence	36	13
23	Jimmy McAuley	Fall River F.C. Pawtucket Rangers	49	13
23	Mike McLeavy	New Bedford Whalers	50	13
27	Rudolph Nickolsburger	Hakoah All-Stars	49	12
27	József Eisenhoffer	Brooklyn Wanderers	50	12
27	George Moorhouse	New York Giants; New York Soccer Club	55	12
30	Johnny Harvey	Pawtucket Rangers	46	11
30	Arthur Scott	Pawtucket Rangers	33	11
32	Leslie Lyell	Brooklyn Wanderers	31	10
32	Alex McNab	Fall River F.C.	44	10
32	Shamus O'Brien	New York Giants; New York Soccer Club	51	10
32	Ernő Schwarz	Hakoah All-Stars	51	10
