= Johnny Reder =

American sportsman (1909–1990)

- Reder with the Boston Red Sox
- First baseman
- Born: September 24, 1909; Lublin, Congress Poland
- Died: April 12, 1990 (aged 80); Fall River, Massachusetts, U.S.
- Batted: Right Threw: Right

MLB debut
- April 16, 1932, for the Boston Red Sox

Last appearance
- June 12, 1932, for the Boston Red Sox

MLB statistics
- Batting average: .135
- Home runs: 0
- Runs batted in: 3
- Stats at Baseball Reference

Teams
- Boston Red Sox (1932)
Association football career
- Position: Goalkeeper
Senior career*
Years	Team	Apps	(Gls)
1927–1928	Champion Niagara		
1928–1929	Walsh Chevrolet		
1929–1931	Fall River F.C.	61	(0)
1931	→ New York Yankees	17	(0)
1931	→ New Bedford Whalers	18	(0)
- * Club domestic league appearances and goals

John Anthony Reder (September 24, 1909 – April 12, 1990) was an American sportsman who, during the 1930s, played soccer with Fall River F.C. and the New Bedford Whalers and baseball for the Boston Red Sox. In soccer, he played as a goalkeeper and won three American Soccer League titles and two National Challenge Cup titles. In baseball, he played as a first baseman for the Boston Red Sox, and was voted Most Valuable Player of the New York–Penn League while playing for the Williamsport Grays. Together with Moe Drabowsky, Nap Kloza and Henry Peploski, Reder is one of only four Major League Baseball players to be born in what is now Poland. (Note: At the time Reder was born, 1909, Poland was not autonomous; see History of Poland (1795–1918).)

== Soccer career ==
=== Early years ===
Born in Lublin in Congress Poland, Reder emigrated to the United States with his family as a youth and settled in Fall River, Massachusetts. Reder initially played as a goalkeeper for several local Fall River amateur teams, including Champion Niagara and Walsh Chevrolet. He helped the latter team reach the quarter-finals of the 1929 National Challenge Cup where they eventually lost 5–1 to Bethlehem Steel. Despite letting in five goals, Reder was noted for his performance.

=== Fall River F.C. ===
As a result of his exploits with Walsh Chevrolet, Reder signed with Fall River F.C. in 1929. Together with a team that included Billy Gonsalves, Bert Patenaude, Werner Nilsen and Alex McNab, Reder helped the 'Marksmen' win American Soccer League titles in both the spring and fall seasons. He also helped them win the National Challenge Cup in both 1930 and 1931. In the 1930 final, the 'Marksmen' defeated Cleveland Bruell Insurance 9–3 on aggregate in a two-leg final and Reder kept goal in both games. On May 30, 1930, he also played for the 'Marksmen' in a 3–2 defeat against a touring Rangers.

In 1931, when Sam Mark relocated and merged the 'Marksmen' franchise twice, Reder followed the team on both occasions. They first moved to New York City, where they merged with New York Soccer Club and became the New York Yankees. However, before the merger was finalized, the 'Marksmen' had entered the National Challenge Cup. After the move, the new club was unable to re-register for the competition, so they continued to play in the Challenge Cup as Fall River F.C.. Reder played in all three games when they beat the Chicago Bricklayers in a final played as a three-game series. At the same time they competed in the Spring 1931 American Soccer League season as the New York Yankees, finishing in third place. In the summer of 1931, Reder also played for a Yankees team featuring Billy Gonsalves, Bert Patenaude and George Moorhouse that twice played Celtic in friendlies. On May 30 at Fenway Park the Yankees won 4–3. However, on June 28 at Yankee Stadium, Celtic won the second game 4–1. For the Fall 1931 season the Yankees moved to New Bedford, Massachusetts, where they merged with Fall River F.C. to become the New Bedford Whalers. While playing for the Whalers, Reder won a third ASL title.

== Baseball ==
Before embarking on a career as a soccer goalkeeper, Reder had played as a first baseman for his high school baseball team. With the decline of the American Soccer League, he then switched back to baseball and in 1932 played 17 games for the Boston Red Sox. After making his debut on April 16, he played ten games at first base, one at third, and six as a pinch-hitter. He had a record of 5 hits, 4 runs, 1 double, 3 RBI, 6 walks and 6 strikeouts and played his last game for the Red Sox on June 12. Reder subsequently played for the Hazleton Mountaineers, Reading Red Sox, and Williamsport Grays in the New York–Penn League and for the Syracuse Chiefs of the International League before ending his baseball career at the age of 28. In 1935, while playing for the Grays, he was voted Most Valuable Player in the New York–Penn League.

== Later years ==
Reder subsequently worked as an engineer and served in the United States Navy during World War II, before returning to Fall River, Massachusetts, where he died in 1990 from arteriosclerotic heart disease. He was buried in St. Patrick's Cemetery, Fall River.

== Honors ==
Soccer

Fall River F.C.

- American Soccer League
  - Winners (2): Spring 1930, Fall 1930
- National Challenge Cup
  - Winners (2): 1930, 1931

New Bedford Whalers

- American Soccer League
  - Winners (1): Fall 1931

Baseball

Williamsport Grays

- New York–Penn League
  - Most Valuable Player (1935)
