= 1931 American Soccer League =

American Soccer League -1931 Season-
- Season: 1931
- Champions: New York Giants
- Top goalscorer: Bob McIntyre (38)

Statistics of American Soccer League in season 1931.

== Overview ==
At the start of this season the American Soccer League was in decline, suffering from the effects of the Great Depression. Clubs had begun to fold, merge and disappear. The eventual champions, New Bedford Whalers, had been formed by Sam Mark following the merger of Fall River F.C. and New York Yankees. Long time ASL members Brooklyn Wanderers folded before the season. However New York Americans, later to become a perennial contender in the second ASL, made their debut.

The season began on February 29, 1931. The first half ended on May 31, 1931. The second half began September 19, 1931, and the season concluded on December 27, 1931. The season saw strong performances by New Bedford Whalers, New York Giants and a resurgent Pawtucket Rangers. Hakoah All-Stars improved markedly to take fourth place. Although the Whalers won this season, they lost the playoff series for the overall 1931 champion, being defeated by Spring 1931 champions New York Giants in a play-off. Whalers took the first game at home 8–3 before the Giants came back to win 6-0, taking the series on a 9-8 aggregate score.

== League standings ==
- The percentage is a percentage of points won to points available, not a win-lose percentage.

=== First half ===
Place	Team	GP	W	D	L	GF	GA	PTS	PCT
1	New York Giants	17	10	2	5	42	28	22	.647
2	Brooklyn Wanderers	16	9	2	5	32	27	20	.625
3	New York Yankees	17	9	3	5	40	27	21	.619
4	Pawtucket Rangers	18	9	3	6	47	33	21	.583
5	Fall River (Note: In late April 1931, the New Bedford Whalers merged with Fall River F.C. The combined team continued under the Fall River name.)	16	8	2	6	28	25	18	.558
6	Hakoah All-Stars	17	5	2	10	25	41	12	.353
7	Newark Americans	13	4	1	8	18	29	9	.346
8	New Bedford Whalers (Note: Following an April 19, 1931, game with Fall River, the New Bedford Whalers merged with Fall River.)	11	3	2	6	18	22	9	.346
9	Boston Bears (Note: The Bears withdrew from the league in early April 1931, having lost six of their seven games. They re-entered the league for the fall half.)	7	1	0	6	10	30	2	.143

=== Second half ===
Place	Team	GP	W	D	L	GF	GA	PTS	PCT
1	New Bedford Whalers (Note: During the mid-season break, Fall River F.C. failed. The New York Yankees then moved to New Bedford, obtained the rights to the name and players of both Fall River F.C. and the New Bedford Whalers. The Yankees then changed their name to the New Bedford Whalers.)	21	14	2	5	60	32	30	.714
2	New York Giants	20	11	4	5	54	38	26	.650
3	Pawtucket Rangers	20	13	0	7	58	42	26	.650
4	Hakoah All-Stars	21	11	4	6	44	34	26	.615
5	Boston Bears (Note: The Bears had withdrawn from the league during the first half of the season, but re-entered for the second half.)	19	4	3	12	34	50	11	.289
6	New York Americans (Note: The Americans were a new team that entered the league during the mid-season break.)	20	3	3	14	32	69	9	.225
7	Newark Americans	11	1	2	8	16	39	4	.183

== Playoff ==
Team 1	Aggregate	Team 2	First leg	Second leg	Attendance
New York Giants	9–8	New Bedford Whalers	3–8	6–0	January 1 • Battery Park • ??? January 3 • Polo Grounds • 4,000

=== First leg ===
January 1, 1932

New Bedford Whalers	8–3	New York Giants
Billy Gonsalves 8', Werner Nilsen, 50'; Tommy Florie,, Hugh Lafferty o.g.'	Report	, 53' Bert Patenaude; 83' Frank Tollan

Battery Park, New Bedford, Massachusetts
Referee: George Lambie

=== Second leg ===
January 3, 1932

New York Giants	6–0	New Bedford Whalers
Shamus O'Brien 20', 53'; Bert Patenaude 23', 80'; Bart McGhee 30'; Jimmy Gallagher 67'	Report

Polo Grounds, New York, New York
Attendance: 4,000

New York Giants won, 9–8, on aggregate.

== Top goalscorers ==
Rank	Scorer	Club	GP	G
1	Bob McIntyre	Pawtucket Rangers	34	38
2	Bert Patenaude	New York Yankees; New York Giants	31	33
3	Willie Crilley	Fall River F.C. Brooklyn Wanderers; Newark Americans	22	23
4	Tommy Florie	New Bedford Whalers; Fall River F.C.	36	22
5	Werner Nilsen	New York Yankees; New Bedford Whalers	29	21
6	Billy Gonsalves	New York Yankees; New Bedford Whalers	36	20
7	Davey Brown	New York Giants	30	18
7	Rudolph Nikolsberger	Hakoah All-Stars	35	18
9	Bill Paterson	Brooklyn Wanderers; Fall River F.C.	30	16
10	Jimmy McAuley	Pawtucket Rangers	35	15
10	Moritz Häusler	Hakoah All-Stars	38	15
11	Nib Hogg	Fall River F.C. Pawtucket Rangers	27	14
12	Tec White	New York Yankees; New Bedford Whalers	38	13
13	Arthur Scott	Pawtucket Rangers	35	12
14	George Moorhouse	New York Yankees; Newark Americans	31	11
14	Bart McGhee	New York Giants	32	11
16	Herbert Carlsson	New York Giants	34	10
