= James White (Scottish footballer) =

Scottish footballer

Tec White
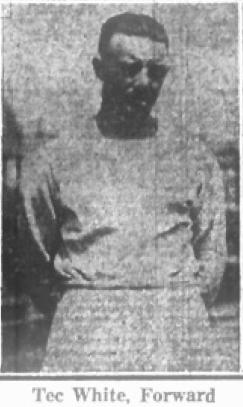

Personal information
- Date of birth: 21 August 1899
- Place of birth: Airdrie, North Lanarkshire, Scotland
- Date of death: August 1983 (aged 83–84)
- Place of death: Bristol, Massachusetts, United States
- Positions: Inside left; wing half

Senior career*
Years	Team	Apps	(Gls)
1920–1922	Albion Rovers	78	(2)
1922–1923	Maidstone United		
1923	→ Heart of Midlothian (loan)	0	(0)
1923–1925	Motherwell	56	(4)
1925–1930	Fall River	243	(111)
1931	→ New York Yankees	17	(4)
1931–1932	→ New Bedford Whalers	21	(9)
1932–1934	New York Brookhattan		
- * Club domestic league appearances and goals

James White (21 August 1899 – August 1983) was a Scottish footballer who spent most of his career playing for Fall River in the American Soccer League. He was born in Airdrie, North Lanarkshire, Scotland.

== Playing career ==
In 1920, White signed with Albion Rovers of the Scottish League and helped them reach the 1920 Scottish Cup final where they lost to Kilmarnock; his brother Jock was also in the side (two other brothers, Willie and Tom, were also footballers – all four played together for Heart of Midlothian in the Lord Provost's Rent Relief Cup final of 1923 which their side won through two goals from Jock). He spent two seasons with Albion before joining Maidstone United of the English Southern League in 1923. After one season with Maidstone, White transferred to Motherwell.

White was one of several players who were recruited from the Scottish League by Sam Mark to play for Fall River Others included Tommy Martin, also from Motherwell, Charlie McGill from Third Lanark and wing-half Bill McPherson from Beith. These players would become the backbone of the very successful 'Marksmen' team during the 1920s and early 1930s. In later seasons his teammates also included, among others, Billy Gonsalves, Bert Patenaude, Werner Nilsen and Alex McNab.

Between 1925 and 1931, White made 243 league appearances and scored 111 goals for the 'Marksmen' in the American Soccer League, helping them win five league titles. He also helped them win the National Challenge Cup three times, scoring two goals in the 1927 final against Holley Carburetor F.C. . He also played for the 'Marksmen' in friendlies against Rangers and Kilmarnock and in 1930 was a member of the 'Marksmen' squad that toured Central Europe.

In 1931 when Sam Mark relocated and merged the 'Marksmen' franchise twice, White followed the team on both occasions. They first moved to New York City, where they merged with New York Soccer Club and became the New York Yankees. In the summer of 1931, White played for a Yankees team featuring Billy Gonsalves, Bert Patenaude and George Moorhouse that twice played Celtic in friendlies. On 30 May at Fenway Park the Yankees won 4–3. However, on 28 June at Yankee Stadium, Celtic won the second game 4–1. The Yankees then moved to New Bedford, Massachusetts where they merged with Providence to become the New Bedford Whalers. With the Whalers, White won a further two American Soccer League titles and the 1932 National Challenge Cup. On 3 April 1932 he scored the opening goal in a 5–2 win against Stix, Bear and Fuller in the second leg of the final.

== Honours ==
Fall River F.C.

- American Soccer League
  - Winners 1925–26, 1928–29, Fall 1929, Spring 1930, Fall 1930: 5
- National Challenge Cup
  - Winners 1927, 1930, 1931: 3
- Lewis Cup
  - Winners 1930: 1
  - Runners Up 1925: 1
- American Cup
  - Runners Up 1924: 1

New Bedford Whalers

- American Soccer League
  - Winners Fall 1931, Spring 1932: 2
- National Challenge Cup
  - Winners 1932: 1
