= Fall 1929 American Soccer League =

American Soccer League -Fall 1929 Season-
- Season: Fall 1929
- Champions: Fall River F.C. (5th title)
- Top goalscorer: Bill Paterson (27)

These are the statistics of the Fall 1929 American Soccer League.

== Overview ==
At the beginning of the 1928-29 American Soccer League season, the league initiated a struggle with the United States Football Association. The controversy centered on the National Challenge Cup, but was really about the question of who controlled soccer in the United States, the team owners or the federation bureaucrats. In September 1928, the league announced it was boycotting the Challenge Cup. Three teams decided to defy the league and enter the cup: Bethlehem Steel, Newark Skeeters and New York Giants. By the end of September, the American Soccer League had suspended the three teams. The USFA responded by suspending the ASL, making it an outlaw league according to FIFA rules. The USFA then went further and created a new league, the Eastern Professional Soccer League, made up of the three ex-ASL teams as well as several from the Southern New York Soccer Association. The two competing leagues, the American Soccer League and Eastern Professional Soccer League vied for fans and public support during the 1928-29 season. Several teams and players jumped between the two leagues during the season. Other, European, players returned to Europe in order to retain their FIFA standing. By the summer of 1929, both leagues were in some financial difficulty. Despite this, they both began a 1929-1930 season while simultaneously holding talks on declaring a truce. The collapse of the stock market in October 1929 led to the onset of the Great Depression which exacerbated the financial problems and gave the two leagues and USFA the motivation to find a solution to the conflict. The two leagues continued to play for several more weeks, but by the beginning of November, 1929, both leagues had suspended operations and agreed to merge into one league called the Atlantic Coast League. The Atlantic Coast league began its season on November 6, 1929. Therefore the standings reflect less than one half of the originally scheduled season. The ASL declared Fall River F.C. the champions.

== League standings ==
Place	Team	GP	W	L	D	GF	GA	Pts	Pct
1	Fall River F.C.	22	15	3	4	65	40	33	.750
2	Providence	22	14	2	6	50	34	30	.682
3	Boston	21	12	3	6	44	22	27	.643
4	New York Nationals	21	10	3	8	58	53	23	.548
5	Pawtucket Rangers	19	8	2	9	32	41	18	.474
6	New Bedford Whalers	21	7	2	12	38	47	16	.381
7	Brooklyn Wanderers	17	5	2	10	32	47	12	.353
8	Brooklyn Hakoah	17	4	1	12	41	55	9	.265
9	Philadelphia (Note: Philadelphia played its first six games as the Bridgeport Bears before moving to Philadelphia.)	14	2	2	10	19	41	6	.214

== Goals leaders ==
Rank	Scorer	Club	Games	Goals
1	Bill Paterson	Providence	22	27
2	John Nelson	New York Nationals	21	26
3	Bert Patenaude	Fall River F.C.	21	25
4	Hookey Leonard	New York Nationals	18	16
5	Billy Gonsalves	Fall River F.C.	22	14
6	Werner Nilsen	Boston	21	13
7	Janos Nehadoma	Brooklyn Wanderers / Brooklyn Hakoah	18	12
8	Heinrich Schönfeld	Brooklyn Hakoah	12	11
8	Tommy Florie	New Bedford Whalers	21	11
10	Dave McEachran	Boston	20	10
10	Percy Barlow	Pawtucket Rangers	15	10

== See also ==
- 1929 Eastern Professional Soccer League
