= Gordon Burness =

Soccer player (1906–1989)

Personal information
- Full name: John Gordon Burness
- Date of birth: 2 October 1906
- Place of birth: Montrose, Scotland
- Date of death: 20 July 1989 (aged 82)
- Place of death: Needham, Massachusetts, United States
- Position: Wing forward

Senior career*
Years	Team	Apps	(Gls)
- Brechin Victoria
1923	Forfar Athletic	11	(0)
1923–1924	Brechin City	19	(1)
- Toronto Scottish
1925–1927	Brooklyn Wanderers	24	(5)
1927–1929	Boston Soccer Club	98	(11)
1929	New Bedford Whalers	10	(1)
1930	Pawtucket Rangers	20	(1)
Fall 1930	Fall River	6	(2)
Spring 1931	→ New York Yankees	12	(3)
Fall 1931	Boston Bears	10	(2)

International career
1925	Canada	1	(1)
1926	United States	1	(0)
- * Club domestic league appearances and goals

John Gordon Burness (2 October 1906 – 20 June 1989) was a soccer player who played as a wing forward. He began his career in Scotland before moving to Canada and then the United States, where he spent six seasons in the American Soccer League. Born in Scotland, he earned a cap with both the Canada and United States national teams.

== Club career ==
Born in Montrose, Burness began playing with local junior side Brechin Victoria, then Forfar Athletic in the Scottish Football League in summer 1923. At the end of the same year, he transferred to Brechin City. He then left Scotland for Canada where he played for Toronto Scottish.

In 1925, he signed with the Brooklyn Wanderers of the American Soccer League. After two seasons, he transferred to the Boston Soccer Club, winning the 1927–28 league title with them.

Burness began the 1929–30 season with Boston, but moved to the New Bedford Whalers after only four games. He played ten with the Whalers, then transferred to the Pawtucket Rangers for one game in the 1929–30 season. He then played nineteen games of the 1930 fall season in Pawtucket, before transferring to the Fall River for the final six league games. The 'Marksmen' merged with the New York Soccer Club in 1931 to form the New York Yankees. Burness remained with the renamed team for the 1931 spring season. However, the team had already begun games in the National Challenge Cup under the name Fall River, so Burness and his teammates won the National Cup as the Fall River That cup went to three games and Burness scored one of the two Fall River goals in the 2–0 final game victory. He then finished his professional career with the Boston Bears in the 1931 fall season.

== International career ==
Burness earned his first cap, with Canada, in a 6–1 loss to the United States on 8 November 1925. He scored the lone Canadian goal in the loss. A year later, he became one of a handful of players to earn a cap with two countries when he played for the U.S. in a 6–2 win over Canada on 6 November 1926.

== Later life ==
Burness later worked as a traffic controller of ocean shipping for Exxon Oil Company.

== See also ==
- List of association footballers who have been capped for two senior national teams
- List of United States men's international soccer players born outside the United States
