= Billy Adair =

American soccer player

Personal information
- Position: Outside forward

Senior career*
Years	Team	Apps	(Gls)
- Hamilton City
1924–1925	New Bedford Whalers	33	(9)
1925	Providence	6	(1)
1925–1926	Brooklyn Wanderers	12	(1)
1926–1927	Philadelphia	7	(1)
1927	Newark Skeeters	5	(1)
1926–1929	Brooklyn Wanderers	113	(35)
1929–1930	New York Giants	18	(3)
1930	Bridgeport Hungaria	2	(0)
1930	Newark Americans	3	(1)
- * Club domestic league appearances and goals

Billy Adair was an early twentieth century soccer outside forward who played professionally in the American Soccer League.

Adair played for Hamilton City in Canada before signing with the New Bedford Whalers of the American Soccer League in 1924. Adair began the 1925–1926 season with the Whalers, played one game, then moved to Providence F.C. This began a nomadic period of Adair's career as he hopped from one team to another. From Providence, he moved to the Brooklyn Wanderers before finishing the season with the Newark Skeeters. During the 1926–1927 season, he played for three teams, finishing the season with the Wanderers. He remained with Brooklyn for three seasons before joining the New York Giants in 1929. That year he played for the Giants in both the Eastern Professional Soccer League and the ASL as the Soccer Wars came to an end. However, when the Giants returned to the ASL, Adair left the team and moved to Bridgeport Hungaria. He then played for the Newark Americans in 1930.
