= Arnie Oliver =

American soccer player

Personal information
- Full name: Arnold Oliver
- Date of birth: May 22, 1907
- Place of birth: New Bedford, Massachusetts, U.S.
- Date of death: October 16, 1993 (aged 86)
- Place of death: New Bedford, Massachusetts, U.S.
- Position: Attacking midfielder

Youth career
- Quisset Mill

Senior career*
Years	Team	Apps	(Gls)
1925–1926	Shawsheen Indians	5	(0)
1926	New Bedford Defenders		
1926–1927	New Bedford Whalers	1	(0)
1927	Hartford Americans	7	(4)
1927–1929	J&P Coats	58	(38)
1929	New Bedford Whalers	5	(0)
1929	Pawtucket Rangers	3	(1)
1930	Fall River F.C.	5	(4)
1930	Providence F.C.	13	(8)
1931	→ Fall River F.C.	1	(0)
1931	Pawtucket Rangers	10	(6)
–1938	Santo Christo		

Managerial career
- 1966–1969: UMass Dartmouth
Medal record
Men's soccer
Representing United States
FIFA World Cup
Third place	1930 Uruguay
- * Club domestic league appearances and goals

Arnold “Lucky Arnie” Oliver (May 22, 1907 – October 16, 1993) was an American soccer midfielder. He spent at least six seasons in the American Soccer League and was a member of the United States national team at the 1930 FIFA World Cup. He is also a member of the National Soccer Hall of Fame.

== Club career ==
Oliver, the son of British immigrants, began his career with the New Bedford Quisset Mill, a cotton mill, club when he was fourteen. He then played with the Shawsheen Indians, a local amateur club which joined the professional American Soccer League in 1925. However, Oliver remained an amateur and when the Indians folded during the season, he moved to the Defenders Club, winning the 1926 National Amateur Cup title with them. Following the Amateur Cup final, Oliver turned professional when he signed with the New Bedford Whalers. He played only one game with the Whalers and in 1927, he moved to the Hartford Americans. However, they were kicked out of the league after only ten games and Oliver moved to J&P Coats for the remainder of the season. He spent most of the 1928–1929 season with J&P Coats, where he was at one point in a three-way tie for the league's scoring lead, but finished the season with the New Bedford Whalers. Oliver then moved to the Pawtucket Rangers for the fall 1929 season. In the fall of 1930, he began the season with the 'Marksmen' before transferring to Providence F.C. In the spring of 1931, he played with Fall River F.C. then with the Pawtucket Rangers in the fall of 1931. Some sources state Oliver ended his career in the American Soccer League in 1931, others say 1935. However, all agree that he finished his career with the amateur Santo Christos in 1938.

== National team ==
In 1930, Oliver was called into the U.S. national team for the 1930 FIFA World Cup. He did not enter any of the U.S. games at the tournament but played several exhibition games during the U.S. team's South American tour following the cup. However, none of those games are considered full internationals.

== Coaching ==
Following his retirement from playing, Oliver coached extensively. In 1966, he became the first head coach of the UMass Dartmouth men's soccer team. From the team's founding in 1966 through the 1969 season, Oliver took the team to a 40-11-2 record.

Oliver was inducted into the National Soccer Hall of Fame in 1968, the New England Soccer Hall of Fame in 1981 and the UMass Dartmouth Hall of Fame in 1997.
