= Werner Nilsen =

American soccer player (1904-1992)

Scotty Nilsen
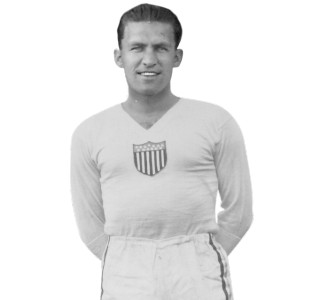
- Nilson with the U.S. national team in 1930

Personal information
- Full name: Werner Nilsen
- Date of birth: February 4, 1904
- Place of birth: Skien, Norway
- Date of death: May 10, 1992 (aged 88)
- Place of death: St. Louis, Missouri, United States
- Positions: Midfielder; forward

Senior career*
| Years | Team | Apps | (Gls) |
| 19xx–19xx | Skiens Grane | | |
| 1923–1925 | Norwegian-Americans | | |
| 1925–1926 | Hub F.C. | | |
| 1926–1929 | Boston Soccer Club | 162 | (86) |
| 1929–1930 | Fall River F.C. | 48 | (24) |
| 1931 | → New York Yankees | 8 | (5) |
| 1931–1932 | → New Bedford Whalers | 21 | (16) |
| 1932 | Boston S.C. | | |
| 1932–1937 | St. Louis Central Breweries F.C. | | |
| 1937–1938 | South Side Radio | | |

International career
| 1934 | United States | 2 | (0) |

Managerial career
- 1946–1947: St. Louis Raiders
- * Club domestic league appearances and goals

Werner "Scotty" Nilsen (February 4, 1904 – May 10, 1992) was a soccer player who played as a forward. He is one of the highest scoring players in United States soccer history, scoring 131 goals in 239 games with the Boston Soccer Club. He won five consecutive National Challenge Cups during his career, and four doubles. Born in Norway, he earned two caps with the United States national team in 1934. He is a member of the National Soccer Hall of Fame.

== Club career ==
=== Early career ===
Nilsen played for Norwegian club Skiens Grane before moving to the United States in 1923. When he arrived, he settled in Boston where he began playing for local amateur and semi-professional soccer teams including the Norwegian-Americans and Hub F.C., both in the Boston and District League.

=== Boston ===
In 1926, Nilsen signed with the Boston Soccer Club of the American Soccer League (ASL). At the time, the ASL was establishing itself as one of the top leagues, both nationally and internationally, and the Wonder Workers were a rising team in the league. Nilsen began as a right half, then moved into the front line as either a center forward or right inside. He won his first league cup (Lewis Cup) in 1927, then his first league title in the 1927–28 season. The next year, he tied János Nehadoma of the Brooklyn Wanderers as the top goal scorers with 43 goals a piece. He also joined Viking F.C. for a tour of Scandinavia. Viking F.C. was an ad hoc traveling team composed of U.S.-based players with ethnic roots in Scandinavia.

=== Fall River ===
Nilsen began the 1929–30 season in Boston, but was transferred to the Fall River F.C. after three games. In Fall River, he played alongside Bert Patenaude on the front line. The onset of the Great Depression in 1929, combined with the costs imposed by the "Soccer Wars" between the ASL and United States Football Association (USFA) led to severe financial problems with the league and its teams. This led to the rapid collapse of several teams and the eventual collapse of the ASL in 1933. Before these happened, Nilsen would win his first "double" as the 'Marksmen' took the 1929–30 league title and the 1930 National Challenge Cup. With financial problems mounting, Sam Mark, owner of the 'Marksmen', merged the team with the New York Soccer Club to form the New York Yankees. The Yankees competed in the spring 1931 season. While the league standings reflect the Yankee name, the team won the 1931 National Challenge Cup under the Fall River F.C. name. As in 1928, Nilsen joined a collection of U.S.-based Scandinavian players in 1931 to make a tour of that region, this time as part of Brooklyn Gjoa.

=== New Bedford ===
To make matters more confusing, in summer of 1931 the Yankees moved to New Bedford, Massachusetts, merged with Fall River F.C. and became the second team to be named the New Bedford Whalers. Despite the turmoil, Nilsen and his teammates added another "double" to their resumes as they took both the 1932 league title and the National Challenge Cup. In league play, Nilsen finished second to ex-teammate Patenaude for the scoring title. The Whalers won the 1932 Challenge Cup title over the St. Louis-based Stix, Baer and Fuller F.C. Both legs of the cup final were held in St. Louis. The first ended in a 3–3 tie. A week later, Whalers won the game and the title with a 5–2 victory; Nilsen scoring one of the goals. After the games, Whaler's Scottish international Alex McNab decided to join Stix as a player/coach for the 1932–33 season. McNab convinced several of his Whalers teammates, including Nilsen, Billy Gonsalves, Bill McPherson and Billy Watson to also make the move west.

=== St. Louis ===
The addition of the core of the Whalers team to an already strong Stix, Baer and Fuller team created a team which dominated the St. Louis and Challenge Cup competitions for several years. The team ran away with the 1932–33 St. Louis Major League title, then won the 1933 National Challenge Cup title, giving Nilsen his third "double". Stix, Baer and Fuller won both games, 1-0 and 2–1 over the New York Americans. Nilsen again scored in the second game. Stix, Baer and Fuller repeated the double the next year as it again won the league and open championships, giving Nilsen five consecutive Open Cup titles and four "doubles". Following the 1934 National Challenge Cup title game, St. Louis Central Breweries F.C. took over sponsorship of the team. Nilsen remained with Central Breweries which won the 1934–35 league championship, but did not participate in the team's 1935 Challenge Cup victory due to injury. The team experienced yet another name change, this time to the St. Louis Shamrocks. Shamrocks went to both the 1936 and 1937 Challenge Cup finals, but lost both times. In 1937, Nilsen joined his last team, South Side Radio before retiring at the end of the 1937–38 season.

Nilsen was inducted into the St. Louis Old Time Soccer Players Hall of Fame in 1983.

== International career ==
In 1934, Nilsen earned two caps with the United States when he was selected to the 1934 FIFA World Cup roster. His first game with the U.S. came on a May 24, 1934 World Cup qualification victory over Mexico. His next game did not end as successfully for the U.S. as it lost to Italy on May 27, 1934, in the finals first round.

== Managerial career ==
Nilsen coached the St. Louis Raiders during the 1946–47 season.

== Personal life ==
According to the Soccer Hall of Fame, Nilsen worked as a machinist and a men's clothing model in both Boston and St. Louis.

== National Soccer Hall of Fame ==
The National Soccer Hall of Fame inducted Nilsen in 2005 as part of a process of recognizing significant pre-1950s players. According to the Hall of Fame, "We were aware that in the early decades of the Hall of Fame a number of outstanding players had slipped through the cracks of the selection process. In order to correct these oversights we established a Blue Ribbon panel consisting of historians Colin Jose, Roger Allaway and Hall of Famer Walter Bahr, to review the credentials of all Veterans from the pre-NASL era. Out of a total of 150 players who met the eligibility criteria, the panel unanimously recommended, and the Board approved, the special induction of these five players." Nilsen and Alex McNab, teammates on both the Whalers and Stix, Baer and Fuller were among the five selected.

== See also ==
- List of United States men's international soccer players born outside the United States
