= 1923–24 Fall River F.C. season =

Fall River F.C.
1923-24 season
- Owner: Sam Mark
- Stadium: Mark's Stadium
- American Soccer League: Winners
- National Challenge Cup: Winners
- American Cup: Runners-up
- Top goalscorer: Harold Brittan (15)
- Biggest win: 7 goals 8-1 vs. Prospect Hill F.C. (2 December 1923)
- Biggest defeat: 1 goal 0-1 at Bethlehem Steel F.C. (15 December 1923); 0-1 vs. Bethlehem Steel F.C. (11 May 1924); 1-2 at Bethlehem Steel F.C. (31 May 1924)

The 1923–24 Fall River F.C. season was the third season for the club in the American Soccer League. The club claimed the double by winning the ASL championship and the National Challenge Cup and was one game away from a treble losing the American Cup final to Bethlehem Steel F.C.

== American Soccer League ==
Date	Opponents	H/A	Result F–A	Scorers	Attendance
7 October 1923	National Giants F.C.	H	2-1	Reid (2)	
13 October 1923	J. & P. Coats F.C.	A	2-2	Campbell, Billy Hibbert	
14 October 1923	J. & P. Coats F.C.	H	2-1	Reid, McKenna	
21 October 1923	Philadelphia F.C.	H	2-0	McPherson, McGowan	
28 October 1923	Newark F.C.	H	2-0	Campbell (2)	
4 November 1923	Brooklyn Wanderers F.C.	H	1-1	Reid	
25 November 1923	New York S.C.	H	1-1	Reid	
8 December 1923	J. & P. Coats F.C.	A	2-0	Brittan (2)	
9 December 1923	Brooklyn Wanderers F.C.	H	3-2	Campbell, Reid, Brittan	
15 December 1923	Bethlehem Steel F.C.	A	0-1		
16 December 1923	Brooklyn Wanderers F.C.	A	1-1	McPherson	
30 December 1923	National Giants F.C.	H	4-2	McPherson, Campbell, Reid, Morley	
6 January 1924	Bethlehem Steel F.C.	H	1-0	McPherson	
12 January 1924	Philadelphia F.C.	A	2-0	McPherson, Morley	
13 January 1924	National Giants F.C.	H	4-0	McKenna (2), McGowan, Morley	
20 January 1924	J. & P. Coats F.C.	H	3-2	McPherson, Lorimer, McGowan	
27 January 1924	New York S.C.	A	2-2	McPherson, Brittan	
2 March 1924	Brooklyn Wanderers F.C.	H	1-0	Morley	
15 March 1924	Philadelphia F.C.	H	3-0	Campbell, Brittan, own goal	
16 March 1924	Newark F.C.	A	4-0	Reid, Brittan (2), Fryer	
24 March 1924	Philadelphia F.C.	H	4-0	Campbell, Brittan (3)	
6 April 1924	Newark F.C.	H	3-0	McPherson, Campbell, Brittan	
20 April 1924	Newark F.C.	H	3-0	McPherson (2), Gallagher	
4 May 1924	New York S.C.	H	3-1	McPherson, Morley, own goal	
17 May 1924	Bethlehem Steel F.C.	A	3-0	McPherson, Brittan (2)	
18 May 1924	New York S.C.	A	0-0		
31 May 1924	Bethlehem Steel F.C.	A	1-2	McKenna	

Pos	Club	Pld	W	D	L	GF	GA	GD	Pts
1	Fall River F.C.	27	19	6	2	59	19	+40	44
2	Bethlehem Steel F.C.	28	18	4	6	63	33	+30	40
3	New York S.C.	28	15	8	5	67	39	+28	38
4	J. & P. Coats F.C.	25	11	5	9	59	54	+5	27
5	Brooklyn Wanderers F.C.	27	9	5	13	47	57	-10	23
6	National Giants F.C.	26	6	6	14	36	64	-28	18
7	Philadelphia F.C.	26	5	3	18	30	64	-34	13
8	Newark F.C.	23	3	1	19	20	53	-33	7

Pld = Matches played; W = Matches won; D = Matches drawn; L = Matches lost; GF = Goals for; GA = Goals against; Pts = Points

== National Challenge Cup ==
Date	Round	Opponents	H/A	Result F–A	Scorers	Attendance
10 November 1923	Second Round; Eastern Division	J. & P. Coats F.C.	A	3-3	McPherson, Brittan (2)	
18 November 1923	Second Round; Eastern Division (replay)	J. & P. Coats F.C.	H	4-0	Campbell, Reid, McKenna (2)	16,000
2 December 1923	Third Round; Eastern Division; Southern New England District	Prospect Hill F.C.	H	8-1	McPherson (2), Lorimer, Campbell, Reid, Brittan (3)	
23 December 1923	Fourth Round; Eastern Division	Wayposet F.C.	H	3-0	McKenna (2), McGowan	
19 January 1924	Semifinals; Eastern Division	Abbot Worsted F.C.	H	2-1	Reid, Brittan	
9 March 1924	Final; Eastern Division	Bethlehem Steel F.C.	at Dexter Park	0-2	Campbell, Reid	
30 March 1924	Final	Vesper-Buick F.C.	A	4-2	Reid, Brittan, Morley (2)	15,000

== American Football Association Cup ==
Date	Round	Opponents	H/A	Result F–A	Scorers	Attendance
1 January 1924	Third Round	Saylesville F.C.	H	2-0	Reid, McPherson	
3 February 1924	Fourth Round	Crompton F.C.	H	6-2	Reid (2), Morley (2), Raeside (2)	
19 April 1924	Semifinals	Abbot Worsted F.C.	at Coats Field	4-1	McPherson, Brittan (2), Morley	
11 May 1924	Final	Bethlehem Steel F.C.	at West Side Park	0-1		

== Notes and references ==
Bibliography

- Jose, Colin (1998). The American Soccer League: The Golden Years of American Soccer 1921-1931. Lanham, Maryland: Scarecrow Press. ISBN 978-0810834293.
- Cahill, Thomas W., ed. (1923). Spalding's Official "Soccer" Football Guide 1923-24. Spalding's "Red Cover" Series of Athletic Handbooks, No. 55R. New York: American Sports Publishing Company.

Footnotes
