= Fall River Soccer Club =

Fall River Soccer Club may refer to:

- Fall River F.C. (1922–1931), team owned by Sam Mark that played in the ASL I
- Fall River F.C. (1932), soccer team that played in ASL I in 1932
- Fall River S.C., soccer team that played in the ASL II
