= Bill McPherson =

Scottish-American soccer player

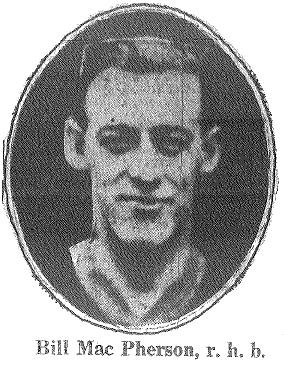

Personal information
- Full name: William McPherson
- Date of birth: September 22, 1897
- Place of birth: Greenock, Scotland
- Date of death: July 1976 (aged 79)
- Position: Wing half

Senior career*
Years	Team	Apps	(Gls)
1919–1921	Morton	7	(1)
1921–1923	Beith		
1923–1930	Fall River	331	(53)
1931	→ New York Yankees	17	(0)
1931–1932	→ New Bedford Whalers		
1932–1934	Stix, Baer and Fuller		
1934–	Pawtucket Rangers		
- * Club domestic league appearances and goals

William McPherson (September 22, 1897 – July 1976) was a Scottish-American soccer wing half. He began his career in Scotland before moving to the American Soccer League. He also spent time in the St. Louis Soccer League, winning a total of five league titles and seven National Challenge Cups during his career.

His record of 370 matches in the U.S. top-flight league stood until being broken by Steve Ralston in 2007.

== Playing career ==
=== Scotland ===
Born in Greenock, McPherson signed with Morton of the Scottish Football League in 1919. In 1922, he began the season with Beith F.C. before leaving Scotland for the United States.

=== American Soccer League ===
When he arrived, he signed with the Fall River of the American Soccer League seeing time in only four games at the end of the 1922–1923 season. He spent most of ten seasons with the 'Marksmen', winning six league titles and three National Challenge Cups (1924, 1927, 1930). In 1931, the 'Marksmen' merged with the New York Soccer Club to form the New York Yankees. He remained with the renamed team for the spring 1931 season. That summer, McPherson won his fourth Challenge Cup with the Yankees. In the summer of 1931, the Yankees merged with the Fall River to form the New Bedford Whalers. Once again McPherson remained with the renamed club, winning the 1932 National Challenge Cup over Stix, Baer and Fuller F.C. of the St. Louis Soccer League (SLSL).

=== St. Louis Soccer League ===
By this time the ASL was on its last legs and Alex McNab left the team to sign with Stix, Baer and Fuller. When he arrived in St. Louis, he induced several of his ex-teammates, including McPherson, to join him. They did so and immediately took SBF to two league and two National Cup championships.

=== American Soccer League II ===
In 1934, McPherson moved back east to sign with the Pawtucket Rangers who were now competing in the second American Soccer League, the first having collapsed in 1933. In 1935, McPherson went to yet another National Cup final, but this time his team failed to take home the title. The Rangers were defeated in three games (7-6 aggregate) by the St. Louis Central Breweries F.C. who featured several of his former teammates from Stix, Baer and Fuller F.C.
