= Bohemian Queens =

Bohemian Queens, also known as Queens Bohemians and New York Bohemians, was an American soccer club based in Queens, New York that was a member of the American Soccer League.

== History ==
Bohemian Queens emerged following the arrival of Irish footballers in New York during the 1920s. Several of these men had previously played in Ireland, including for Bohemian FC in Dublin, and they formed an amateur side generally referred to as the New York Bohemians. They wore red and black, trained in familiar routines from home and competed in the city's amateur leagues. Their standard was mixed, but they were reported on regularly and held a steady mid-table presence until the end of the decade.

By the early 1930s, a related identity appeared in Queens under the name Bohemian Americans. This was a separate group, but it drew on the same migrant community and maintained the Bohemian name. In 1932, they featured in a series of high-profile exhibition matches during a period when the American Soccer League was struggling with financial pressure and club withdrawals. In late September and early October 1932, the team prepared to enter a newly announced competition called the National Soccer League. They played at least two documented matches in this context, including a win over Newark Rangers and a draw with the New York Americans, before the league collapsed after only a handful of games.

Later in 1932, the reorganised American Soccer League needed to replace the folded New Bedford Whalers franchise. The slot was taken by a Queens-based side listed as Bohemian Queens, which appears to have been a continuation of the Bohemian Americans identity brought formally into the ASL's autumn schedule. Their tenure was brief, reflecting the instability of American football during the Great Depression.

In early 1933, the ASL split into Metropolitan and New England divisions. The New England clubs soon ceased participating, and fixtures became irregular. Within this fractured landscape, the Bohemian Queens' identity faded quickly. Contemporary records suggest that the franchise's position was soon taken over by another ethnic club, the Prague Americans of Astoria, signalling the end of the Bohemian name in the league.

== Year-by-year ==
Year	Division	League	Reg. season	Playoffs	U.S. Open Cup
Fall 1932	1	ASL	7th	No playoff	?
Spring 1933	1	ASL	?	?	?
