= Nib Hogg =

Scottish footballer

Personal information
- Full name: James Hogg
- Date of birth: 1903
- Place of birth: Montrose, Scotland
- Position: Outside right

Senior career*
Years	Team	Apps	(Gls)
1924–1927	J&P Coats	34	(9)
1927–1930	Providence	128	(17)
1931	Fall River	2	(0)
1931	Pawtucket Rangers	25	(14)
- * Club domestic league appearances and goals

James "Nib" Hogg was a Scottish association football outside right who played professionally in the American Soccer League.

In 1924, Hogg signed with J&P Coats of the American Soccer League. In January 1927, J&P Coats gave Hogg an unconditional release after he played no first team games with them to that point in the season. He joined Providence soon after and remained with them until 1930.
