= Bobby Yule =

Scottish footballer

Personal information
- Full name: Robert Yule
- Place of birth: Scotland
- Position: Wing forward

Senior career*
Years	Team	Apps	(Gls)
1919–1922	Aberdeen	27	(1)
1923–1930	Brooklyn Wanderers	190	(40)
1930	New York Giants	23	(7)
1931	Fall River	8	(0)
1931	New York Yankees	7	(2)
Total		255	(50)
- * Club domestic league appearances and goals

Robert 'Bobby' Yule was a Scottish football wing forward who began his career in Scotland before moving to the American Soccer League where he played for eight years.

In 1919, Yule signed with Aberdeen F.C. in the Scottish League. He saw time in only 27 games before leaving Scotland in 1922. He may have spent a year in Fore River. In 1923, he signed with the Brooklyn Wanderers in the American Soccer League. In 1930, he moved to the New York Giants then the Fall River and ended his career with the New York Yankees.
