= Leslie Lyell =

English footballer

Personal information
- Place of birth: Southall, England
- Position: Inside forward

Senior career*
Years	Team	Apps	(Gls)
- Brantford Cockshutts
1925–1929	Brooklyn Wanderers	110	(37)
1927	→ Boston (loan)	1	(0)
1929	New York Giants	24	(7)
1930–1931	Brooklyn Wanderers	42	(12)
1931	Newark Americans	0	(0)
- * Club domestic league appearances and goals

Leslie Lyell was an English footballer who spent his entire professional career in the American Soccer League.

Born in England, Lyell began his career in Canada where he played for Brantford Cockshutts, a team sponsored by the Cockshutt Plow Company. In 1925, Lyell signed with the Brooklyn Wanderers of the American Soccer League. In May 1926, Lyell broke his shin bone in an exhibition match with Hakoah Vienna. He lost the rest of the season and did not regain a spot in the starting eleven until well into the 1926–27 season. He played one game on loan to the Boston Soccer Club. His best season, statistically came in 1928–1929 when he scored seventeen goals, putting him eleventh on the scoring list. In September 1929, Lyell moved to the New York Giants. When the Giants left the ASL and entered the Eastern Professional Soccer League as part of the Soccer War, Lyell went with the Giants, but returned to the Wanderers later in the season. In the fall of 1931, Lyell signed with the Newark Americans, but played only three league cup games, scoring two goals. He never entered a first-team league game with Newark.
