= Jimmie Baillie =

Canadian soccer player

Personal information
- Position: Forward

Senior career*
Years	Team	Apps	(Gls)
–1927	Montreal CNR		
1927–	Montréal Carsteel FC		
1930	New York Soccer Club	26	(13)

International career
1926	Canada	1	(0)
- * Club domestic league appearances and goals

Jimmie Baillie was a Canadian soccer player who spent most of his career in Montreal, and played one season in the American Soccer League.

== Club career ==
Baillie played for both CNR and Carsteel in Montreal. In 1930, he spent one season with the New York Soccer Club of the American Soccer League.

== International ==
On June 11, 1926, Baillie earned a cap with the Canada in a 6–2 loss to the United States.
