= Providence Clamdiggers =

Providence Clamdiggers may refer to:

- Providence Clamdiggers (baseball), 1894 American minor league baseball team
- Providence F.C., 1920s American soccer team
