= Jerry Best (footballer, born 1901) =

English footballer (1901–1975)

Personal information
- Full name: Jeremiah Best
- Date of birth: 23 January 1901
- Place of birth: Mickley, England
- Date of death: 18 March 1975 (aged 74)
- Place of death: Darlington, England
- Height: 5 ft 8 1/2 in (1.74 m)
- Position: Forward

Senior career*
Years	Team	Apps	(Gls)
1919–1920	Newcastle United	2	(0)
1920–1921	Leeds United	11	(1)
1924–1925	Providence	29	(20)
1925–1929	New Bedford Whalers	162	(66)
1930	Fall River	2	(1)
1930	Pawtucket Rangers	17	(15)
1930–1931	New Bedford Whalers	31	(35)
1931–1933	Clapton Orient		
1933–1937	Darlington	109	(68)
1937	Hull City	31	(11)
1938–1939	Hexham	37	(14)
- * Club domestic league appearances and goals

Jeremiah Best (23 January 1901 – 18 March 1975) was an English footballer who began his career in England before moving to the American Soccer League. He led the league in scoring in 1930. In 1931, he returned to England, where he finished his career. He was born in Mickley, England.

== Career ==
Best began his professional career in December 1919 with Newcastle United. He played only two games before being transferred to Leeds United in July 1920 for L100. While he began the season as the starting left inside forward, he lost his position to Basil Wood. He left the team in 1921 and spent several years playing non-league football before moving to the United States in 1924 to sign with the Providence of the American Soccer League. In his first season in the league, he scored twenty-goals in twenty-nine games. In 1925, he moved to the New Bedford Whalers remaining there for the next four seasons. In 1929, Best played two games for the Fall River He then jumped to the Pawtucket Rangers for the remainder of the season. In the summer of 1930, Best rejoined the Whalers, leading the league in scoring with thirty-five goals in twenty-seven games in the fall 1930 season. In 1931, Best moved back to England, signing with Clapton Orient for two seasons. In 1933, he transferred to Darlington where he became one of the club's all-time leading scorers. He finished his career with Hull City in the 1936–37 season.

== Honours ==
=== As a player ===
Darlington

- Third Division (North) Cup winner: 1933–34
- Third Division (North) Cup runner-up: 1935–36
