= Frank Tollan =

Scottish footballer

Personal information
- Date of birth: December 27, 1901
- Place of birth: Baillieston, Scotland
- Position: Forward

Senior career*
Years	Team	Apps	(Gls)
1927–1928	Hamilton Academicals		
1928–1929	Cowdenbeath		
1929	New Bedford Whalers	14	(1)
1929	New York Nationals	1	(0)
1930	Bethlehem Steel	6	(1)
1930–1931	New York Giants	48	(6)
- * Club domestic league appearances and goals

Frank Tollan was a Scottish footballer who played in Scotland and the American Soccer League.

In the fall of 1929, Tollan signed with the New Bedford Whalers of the American Soccer League. New Bedford released him after fourteen games and the New York Nationals had him play for one game. He then spent time with an amateur team in the New York area. In March 1930, Toner joined Bethlehem Steel. Bethlehem withdrew from the league during the 1930 summer break and Tollan joined the New York Giants for the second half of the 1930 season as well as the 1931 season. He was part of one of the most improbable comebacks as the Giants took the 1931 League Cup after losing the first game, 8-3, to the Whalers. Tollan scored the second Giants goal in that game. Frank Tollan followed and supported Glasgow Celtic his entire life. Although raised in Hamilton his love of the pure and passionate football that Celtic provided instantly made an impact on his and his entire family and friends life. He was noted as saying "Football without the fans is nothing" .
