= Nap Kloza =

American baseball player (1903–1962)

- Outfielder
- Born: Jan Klojzy; September 7, 1903; Siedliska, (Note: There are multiple places named Siedliska in Galicia; it is not clear which is Kloza's birthplace.) Austria-Hungary
- Died: June 11, 1962 (aged 58); Milwaukee, Wisconsin, U.S.
- Batted: Right Threw: Right

MLB debut
- August 16, 1931, for the St. Louis Browns

Last MLB appearance
- June 26, 1932, for the St. Louis Browns

MLB statistics
- Batting average: .150
- Home runs: 0
- Runs batted in: 2
- Stats at Baseball Reference

Teams
- St. Louis Browns (1931–1932)

John Clarence "Nap" Kloza (born Jan Klojzy; September 7, 1903 – June 11, 1962) was an American professional baseball player and manager. Listed at 5' 11", 180 lb., he batted and threw right-handed. During his life, he was known as Jack Kloza.

Kloza is recognized as one of four major league baseball players born in what is now Poland, along with Moe Drabowsky, Henry Peploski and Johnny Reder. At age 28, it had been a long journey to the major leagues for Kloza. He made his professional debut in 1925 as an outfielder with the Blytheville Tigers of the Tri-State League, but spent nearly seven full seasons in the minors with eleven teams before reaching the majors in 1931 with the St. Louis Browns.

While playing for the Montgomery Lions in 1926, Kloza led the Southeastern League with a .379 average and nine home runs in 114 games. Then, in 1927 he hit .404 with 28 homers in 122 games for the Albany Nuts in the same league. After that, he batted .347 with 28 home runs in 1930 for the Wichita Falls Spudders of the Texas League, and .319 with 22 homers for the Milwaukee Brewers of the American Association in 1931, being promoted to the Browns late in the season.

Kloza was hailed as a potential Babe Ruth at that time, but his major league experience was cut short by illness, from which he never fully recovered his best playing strength, appearing in parts of two seasons. He was a .150 hitter in 22 games, driving in two runs and scoring five more without home runs.

In 1933 Kloza returned to the minors, playing for the Brewers during four seasons before retiring at age 32. In a 12-year minor league career, he hit .312 with 153 home runs and a .532 slugging average in 1217 games. Following his playing retirement, he promoted baseball activities for the youth. In 1944 he managed the Rockford Peaches of the All-American Girls Professional Baseball League, guiding his club to a 25–23 record while finishing third out of four opponents.

Kloza was a longtime resident of Milwaukee, Wisconsin, where he died at the age of 58. He is part of the AAGPBL permanent display at the Baseball Hall of Fame and Museum at Cooperstown, New York, opened in 1988, which is dedicated to the entire league rather than any individual player.
