= Henry Peploski =

American baseball player (1905-1982)

- Third baseman / Pinch hitter
- Born: September 15, 1905; Garlin, Poland (Note: It is not clear where exactly Garlin is; depending on the location, at the time of Peploski's birth it could have been part of Austria-Hungary, the Russian Empire, Congress Poland (nominally), or the German Empire.)
- Died: January 28, 1982 (aged 76); Dover, New Jersey, U.S.
- Batted: Left Threw: Right

MLB debut
- September 19, 1929, for the Boston Braves

Last MLB appearance
- October 6, 1929, for the Boston Braves

MLB statistics
- Batting average: .200
- Hits: 2
- Home runs: 0
- Runs batted in: 1
- Stats at Baseball Reference

Teams
- Boston Braves (1929)

Henry Stephen Peploski (September 15, 1905 – January 28, 1982), nicknamed "Pep", was an American professional baseball player who was an infielder in the major leagues in 1929. He played for the Boston Braves and is recognized as one of six major leaguers born in what is now Poland, along with Moe Drabowsky, Nap Kloza, Jack Katoll, Skel Roach, and Johnny Reder.
