= Harold Brittan =

English footballer (1894–1959)

Personal information
- Full name: Harold Pemberton Brittan
- Date of birth: 11 November 1894
- Place of birth: Derby, England
- Date of death: 3 May 1959 (aged 64)
- Place of death: Philadelphia, Pennsylvania, U.S.
- Position: Center forward

Youth career
- Ilkeston United

Senior career*
Years	Team	Apps	(Gls)
1913–1920	Chelsea	24	(7)
1919	→ Leicester Fosse (loan)	2	(0)
1920–1921	Bethlehem Steel	11	(14)
1921–1922	Philadelphia Field Club	17	(27)
1922–1926	Fall River	77	(87)
1926	New Bedford Whalers	13	(5)
1927–1928	Fall River	29	(16)
Total		173	(156)

Managerial career
- 1922–1926: Fall River
- 1926: New Bedford Whalers
- * Club domestic league appearances and goals

Harold Pemberton Brittan (11 November 1894 – 3 May 1959) was an American-English soccer center forward. He began his career in England with Chelsea before moving to the United States. In the U.S. he was a prolific goalscorer with the powerhouse Bethlehem Steel, Philadelphia Field Club and Fall River clubs in the National Association Football League and American Soccer League. He was inducted into the National Soccer Hall of Fame in 1951.

== England ==
Brittan began his professional career with English First Division club Chelsea during the 1913–1914 season. He saw time in only two games, scoring two goals. The next season, his playing time increased to only nine games in which he scored another two goals. When World War I began in 1914, Brittan was called into the British Army, serving three and a half years. In 1919, he rejoined Chelsea for the 1919–1920 season. He still saw limited playing time in only thirteen games, scoring only three goals. However, two of those came as game winners over Liverpool. Chelsea would not take a league double off Liverpool again until 2005. In March 1919, Chelsea loaned him to Leicester Fosse for two games. By the end of the 1919–1920 season, Brittan had become dissatisfied with both playing for Chelsea and life in England. Most of his family had moved to the U.S. where they settled in Philadelphia and Brittan decided to join them. When the management of top U.S. club Bethlehem Steel heard that he was coming to the U.S., they immediately signed him.

== United States ==
=== Bethlehem Steel ===
Brittan signed with Bethlehem Steel of the National Association Football League (NAFBL) at the end of the 1919–1920 season, playing only one game, but scoring the lone goal, in a 1–0 victory over Brooklyn Robins Dry Dock. This was a significant goal in that Bethlehem won the league title by one point over Erie A.A. Brittan found his form as Bethlehem's starting center forward at the beginning of the 1920-1921 NAFBL season. He not only scored at a prolific rate, but assisted on numerous goals. This led to interest in reacquiring Brittan on the part of Chelsea. The Pensioners reputedly offered Bethlehem up $15,000 for his contract. Bethlehem rebuffed Chelsea and Brittan led the Steel Men to a six-point margin of victory in the league standings. However, the NAFBL was declining by this time and in the summer of 1921, several of the league's stronger teams combined with other regional powerhouses to create the first American Soccer League (ASL).

=== Philadelphia Field Club ===
The creation of the ASL led to the brief disestablishment of the Bethlehem Steel team. Edgar and W. Luther Lewis, owners of Bethlehem Steel, decided to move the team to Philadelphia where it would compete under the name Philadelphia Field Club. The reasons for this move remain unknown but some suspect the two brothers wanted to capitalize on the greater population of Philadelphia to provide a financial base for their team. As a result, Brittan played the 1921-1922 ASL season with Philadelphia. Using the core of the old Bethlehem Steel team, Philadelphia easily won the league title. Brittan also won the league scoring title with 24 (some reports say 27) goals in 17 games. This was despite sitting out seven games over a two-month period after injuring his leg in December 1921. The Lewis brothers' ploy to increase revenue by relocating their team to Philadelphia failed and they were forced to sell several players to cover the team's debts.

=== Fall River ===
In September 1922, Brittan signed with Fall River after team owner Sam Mark purchased his contract from the Lewis brothers. When Brittan arrived in Fall River, he was also given coaching duties in addition to his playing responsibilities. Mark was not disappointed with this move as Brittan would go on to score 135 goals in 168 league games between 1922 and 1926, with a brief return in 1927–1928. Building on Brittan's goal production and coaching, the 'Marksmen' won the league title in 1924, 1925 and 1926. They also won the 1924 National Challenge Cup.

=== New Bedford Whalers ===
In August 1926, Fall River surprisingly released Brittan. He quickly signed with the New Bedford Whalers as a player-coach, but retired a few months later when the Whalers sold his contract to the Providence Clamdiggers. Apparently, Brittan had become a successful local businessman, owning an automobile dealership, and did not want to move to Providence.

=== Return to Fall River ===
In the spring of 1927, Brittan decided to return to the field, this time back with Fall River While the 'Marksmen' finished third in the league, they won the 1927 National Challenge Cup, defeating Detroit Holley Carburetor F.C. by a score of 7–0. Brittan scored one goal in that victory. Brittan then played one last complete season with the 'Marksmen', scoring 16 goals in 28 games, giving him his team record 135 goals in 168 league games during two stints in Fall River.

== Team owner ==
Brittan permanently retired after the 1927–28 season and devoted himself to his business interests. By 1931, the twin depredations of the Great Depression and the U.S. Soccer Wars had taken their tolls on the American Soccer League. Several teams were folding and others were relocating in attempts to maintain their financial solvency. Sam Mark had moved the 'Marksmen' to New York City. In response, Brittan led a group of local businessmen who purchased Providence and moved the team to Fall River, renaming it Fall River The team failed a few months later. This was Brittan's last foray into the sport which had played such a large part in his life.

== Disappearance and arrest ==
After retiring from soccer, Brittan was treasurer of the Fall River Motor Car Company. In January 1932, his employer reported him missing to the Fall River Police. Following his disappearance, the company discovered it was in debt and declared bankruptcy. Brittan was later accused of stealing three cars from a Brookline, Massachusetts automobile firm and was a fugitive until his arrest in New York City on 1 May 1934. He made full restitution, and on 15 May 1934 the charges against him were dismissed.

== Honors ==
Brittan was inducted into the National Soccer Hall of Fame in 1951.
