= Bert Patenaude =

American soccer player (1909–1974)

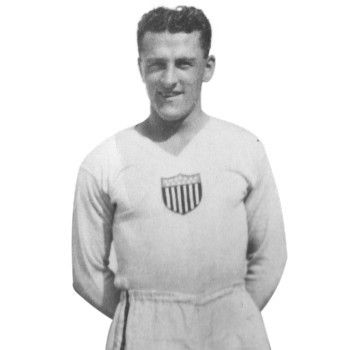
- Patenaude with the United States in 1930

Personal information
- Full name: Joseph Bertrand Arthur Patenaude
- Date of birth: November 4, 1909
- Place of birth: Fall River, Massachusetts, U.S.
- Date of death: November 4, 1974 (aged 65)
- Place of death: Fall River, Massachusetts, U.S.
- Position: Forward

Senior career*
Years	Team	Apps	(Gls)
1928	Philadelphia Field Club	8	(6)
1928	→ J&P Coats	1	(0)
1928–1931	Fall River FC	114	(112)
1930	→ Newark Americans (loan)	5	(7)
1933–1934	Philadelphia German-Americans		
1934–1936	St. Louis Central Breweries	24	(21)
1936	Philadelphia Passon	22	(24)
Total		174+	(170+)

International career
1930	United States	4	(6)
Medal record
Men's soccer
Representing United States
FIFA World Cup
Third place	1930 Uruguay
- * Club domestic league appearances and goals

Bertrand "Bert" Arthur Patenaude (/ˈpætnoʊd/; November 4, 1909 – November 4, 1974) was an American soccer player who played as a forward. Although it was formerly disputed, he is officially credited by FIFA as the scorer of the first hat-trick in World Cup history. He is a member of the United States Soccer Hall of Fame.

== Club career ==
Born in Massachusetts in 1909, Patenaude began playing in the competitive local leagues in his hometown of Fall River, Massachusetts. In 1928, he signed his first professional contract with Philadelphia Field Club of the American Soccer League. In his eight games with Philadelphia, he scored six goals. Despite this productivity, he moved to J&P Coats for one league game, then moved again to his hometown Fall River F.C. While playing with the 'Marksmen', Patenaude formed a lethal striking partnership with another local Massachusetts player, Billy Gonsalves (scoring 112 goals in 114 appearances with the Massachusetts club). He remained in Fall River until the summer of 1930, winning the 1930 National Challenge Cup before moving to the Newark Americans. He scored seven goals in five games at the start of the 1930 and 1931 season, but found himself back with the 'Marksmen' for the end of the season. In 1931, Fall River merged with the New York Soccer Club to form the New York Yankees. However, Fall River had already begun playing National Cup games. Therefore, while the Yankees won the National Cup, the records show the winner as Fall River. In the cup championship, Patenaude scored five goals in the Yankees' 6–2 first game victory over Chicago's Bricklayers and Masons F.C. Patenaude remained with the Yankees through the spring of 1931. That same year, the Yankees moved to New Bedford, Massachusetts, where the team took up the name of the defunct New Bedford Whalers.

The ASL was collapsing by the fall of 1931 and records are incomplete, but it appears that in 1933, Patenaude signed with the Philadelphia German-Americans of the second American Soccer League. In 1934, Patenaude moved west to sign with St. Louis Central Breweries of the St. Louis Soccer League, at that point the only professional league in the country. Central Breweries, stocked with future Hall of Famers, won the league and 1935 National Challenge Cup titles. In 1935, Central Breweries left the league, became an independent team and lost the sponsorship of the brewery. Patenaude remained with the team, now called the St. Louis Shamrocks. In 1936, the Shamrocks went to the National Cup final before falling to the Philadelphia German-Americans.

In 1936, Patenaude returned east where he played one season with Philadelphia Passon of the ASL before he disappeared from the professional scene. Patenaude returned to Fall River and worked in painting and carpentry until his death in 1974.

== International career ==
In 1930, Patenaude was called into the U.S. national team for the 1930 FIFA World Cup. In that cup, he scored a goal in the U.S. opener against Belgium, then a hat trick in the 3–0 victory over Paraguay. Following the U.S. elimination by Argentina in the semifinals, the U.S. went on an exhibition tour of South America, ending with a 4–3 loss to Brazil in which Patenaude scored his sixth and final U.S. goal and never again appeared with the national setup.

Patenaude's record of four goals in one World Cup remains the standard for an American player. Additionally, his total stood as the all-time career mark for an American player until Landon Donovan notched his third, fourth, and fifth career World Cup goals at the 2010 edition.

=== World Cup hat-trick ===
Patenaude's historic day came on July 17, 1930, as the United States played Paraguay in the inaugural World Cup. Patenaude scored the opening goal in the tenth minute. A second goal in the fifteenth minute had been credited several different ways: as an own goal by Aurelio González (according to the RSSSF), a regular goal by the U.S.'s Tom Florie (according to the official FIFA match record), or as Patenaude's second goal (according to the United States Soccer Federation). A fiftieth-minute goal by Patenaude gave the U.S. a 3–0 win over the South Americans. He remained the only American to have a multi-goal game in the World Cup until 2026, when Folarin Balogun scored twice, coincidentally also against Paraguay.

The dispute and discrepancies over the second goal had led to confusion over the first-ever World Cup hat-trick, as Argentina's Guillermo Stábile scored one against Mexico just two days after the U.S.-Paraguay game. FIFA announced on November 10, 2006, that Patenaude was the first person to score a hat-trick in World Cup play, confirming that he scored all three goals. Patenaude and Folarin Balogun are the only American players to have scored multiple goals in one match at the World Cup for the United States.

Patenaude was inducted into the U.S. Soccer Hall of Fame in 1971. He died in Fall River on his sixty-fifth birthday.

== Career statistics ==
Scores and results list the United States' goal tally first, score column indicates score after each Patenaude goal.

List of international goals scored by Bert Patenaude
No.	Date	Venue	Opponent	Score	Result	Competition
1	July 13, 1930	Estadio Gran Parque Central, Montevideo, Uruguay	Belgium	3–0	3–0	1930 FIFA World Cup
2	July 17, 1930	Estadio Gran Parque Central, Montevideo, Uruguay	Paraguay	1–0	3–0	1930 FIFA World Cup
3	July 17, 1930	Estadio Gran Parque Central, Montevideo, Uruguay	Paraguay	2–0	3–0	1930 FIFA World Cup
4	July 17, 1930	Estadio Gran Parque Central, Montevideo, Uruguay	Paraguay	3–0	3–0	1930 FIFA World Cup
5	August 17, 1930	Estádio das Laranjeiras, Rio de Janeiro, Brazil	Brazil	1–2	3–4	Friendly
6	August 17, 1930	Estádio das Laranjeiras, Rio de Janeiro, Brazil	Brazil	2–4	3–4	Friendly

== Honors ==
Fall River F.C.

- American Soccer League: 1928–29, 1929, 1930
- National Challenge Cup: 1930, 1931

St. Louis Central Breweries

- National Challenge Cup: 1935

United States

- FIFA World Cup third place: 1930

Individual

- FIFA World Cup Bronze Boot: 1930
- FIFA World Cup All-Star Team: 1930
- U.S. Soccer Hall of Fame: 1971
