= Hugh Lafferty =

Scottish footballer

Personal information
- Date of birth: 16 November 1901
- Place of birth: Glasgow, Scotland
- Date of death: 24 December 1970 (aged 69)
- Place of death: Glasgow, Scotland
- Height: 5 ft 9 in (1.75 m)
- Position: Left half

Senior career*
Years	Team	Apps	(Gls)
1923–1924	Fulham	4	(0)
1926–1929	St Johnstone	68	(1)
1929–1931	New York Nationals/Giants	83	(4)
1932–1934	King's Park	54	(0)
Total		209	(5)
- * Club domestic league appearances and goals

Hugh Lafferty (16 November 1901 – 24 December 1970) was a Scottish association football half back who played professionally in Scotland, England and the United States.

Lafferty spent time with teams in both Scotland (St Johnstone) and England (Fulham), who later progressed to their countries' respective top divisions, before moving to the United States in 1929 to join the New York Nationals of the American Soccer League. In 1930, the Nationals were renamed the Giants and Lafferty played for them through the 1931 season. He was married with three children and retired to Kilsyth in Scotland.
