= János Nehadoma =

Hungarian footballer

Personal information
- Full name: János Nehadoma
- Date of birth: 20 August 1901
- Place of birth: Budapest, Hungary
- Date of death: December, 1989
- Position: Center forward

Senior career*
| Years | Team | Apps | (Gls) |
| 1920–1925 | Húsiparosok SC | | |
| 1925–1927 | Pistoiese | 36 | (33) |
| 1927–1929 | Brooklyn Wanderers | 68 | (55) |
| 1929 | Brooklyn Hakoah | 5 | (7) |
| 1929–1930 | Brooklyn Wanderers | 32 | (18) |
| 1931–1932 | Pistoiese | 13 | (5) |
| 1932–1933 | Livorno | 32 | (26) |
| 1933–1936 | Fiorentina | 53 | (12) |
| 1936 | Modena | 7 | (1) |

Managerial career
- 1930–1932: Pistoiese
- 1936–1938: Modena
- 1938–1939: Triestina
- 1939–1940: Spezia
- 1941–1945: Atalanta
- 1945–1947: Bari
- 1947–1948: Mantova
- 1955–1956: Ternana
- 1957–1958: L'Aquila
- * Club domestic league appearances and goals

János Nehadoma (born 20 August 1901, date of death unknown) was a Hungarian soccer center forward. He began his career in the Italian Serie B before moving to the American Soccer League where he shared the 1928–29 scoring title. Later in his career he played for Serie A club Fiorentina. After retiring from playing, he spent several seasons as a club manager.

== Playing ==
Nehadoma was born in Budapest, Hungary. He began his senior career with Húsiparosok SC, a Hungarian second division club composed of workers from Budapest's meat packing industry. Amid a series of scandals rocking the league, he joined Italian Serie B club A.C. Pistoiese in 1925. He spent only two seasons with the club before leaving Europe for the United States, as foreigners were no longer allowed to play football in Italy. Nehadoma arrived in the U.S., signing with the Brooklyn Wanderers at the end of the 1927–28 American Soccer League season. He played seven games, scoring seven goals for Brooklyn. The next season, Nehadoma scored forty-three goals, tying Werner Nilsen for the scoring title. In the fall of 1929, he began with the Wanderers before moving to Brooklyn Hakoah for five games. He returned to the Wanderers for the spring 1930 season. In 1931, Nehadoma had returned to Italy, re-signing with Pistoiese. He saw time in only thirteen league games before moving to Livorno in 1932. He spent one season there, scoring 26 league goals, before moving to the Serie A with Fiorentina. However, he lasted only three seasons at the top of Italian soccer before returning to Serie B with Modena F.C. He retired after playing seven games with Modena.

== Coaching ==
In 1941, Nehadoma was hired to manage Serie A club Atalanta B.C. After five seasons, he moved to A.C. Mantova of Serie B. He spent only one season in Mantova before retiring in 1948.

== Career statistics ==
=== Club ===
Appearances and goals by club, season and competition
| Club | Season | League | | |
| Club | Season | Division | Apps | Goals |
|---|---|---|---|---|
| Húsiparosok SC | 1923–24 | Nemzeti Bajnokság II | 8 | 3 |
| Húsiparosok SC | 1924–25 | Nemzeti Bajnokság II | 25 | 14 |
| Húsiparosok SC | Total | | 33 | 17 |
| Pistoiese | 1925–26 | Seconda Divisione | 19 | 18 |
| Pistoiese | 1926–27 | Prima Divisione | 17 | 15 |
| Pistoiese | Total | | 36 | 33 |
| Brooklyn Wanderers | 1927–28 | ASL | 7 | 7 |
| Brooklyn Wanderers | 1928–29 | ASL | 48 | 43 |
| Brooklyn Wanderers | 1929 | ASL | 13 | 5 |
| Brooklyn Wanderers | Total | | 68 | 55 |
| Brooklyn Hakoah | 1929 | ASL | 5 | 7 |
| Brooklyn Wanderers | 1930 | ASL | 32 | 18 |
| Pistoiese | 1931–32 | Serie B | 13 | 5 |
| Livorno | 1932–33 | Serie B | 32 | 26 |
| Fiorentina | 1933–34 | Serie A | 30 | 7 |
| Fiorentina | 1934–35 | Serie A | 20 | 5 |
| Fiorentina | 1935–36 | Serie A | 3 | 0 |
| Fiorentina | Total | | 53 | 12 |
| Modena | 1936–37 | Serie B | 7 | 1 |
| Career total | | | 279 | 174 |
