= 1926 International Soccer League =

Statistics

Statistics of the International Soccer League for the 1926 season.

== League standings ==
Team	Pld	W	D	L	GF	GA	GD	Pts
Brooklyn Wanderers	9	5	3	1	25	10	+15	13
Boston Soccer Club	4	4	0	0	16	3	+13	8
New Bedford Whalers	4	3	0	1	16	8	+8	7 (Note: 1 bonus point?)
Toronto Ulster United FC	5	2	1	2	8	9	−1	6 (Note: 1 bonus point?)
Montréal Carsteel FC	4	0	1	3	5	12	−7	1
Toronto City	4	0	1	3	7	19	−12	1
Montreal Scottish	3	0	1	2	1	17	−16	1
Montreal Maroons	1	0	0	1	0	5	−5	0

Source: rsssf.com
