= Bill Paterson (footballer, born 1897) =

Scottish footballer (1897–1970)

Personal information
- Full name: William Paterson
- Date of birth: 5 March 1897
- Place of birth: Hill of Beath, Scotland
- Date of death: 31 July 1970 (aged 73)
- Place of death: Cowdenbeath, Scotland
- Height: 5 ft 9 in (1.75 m)
- Position: Centre forward

Senior career*
Years	Team	Apps	(Gls)
- Foulford White Rose
- Cowdenbeath Wednesday
1914–1920	Cowdenbeath	27	(31)
1916–1917	→ Rangers (loan)	5	(3)
1921–1924	Derby County	66	(24)
1924–1925	Cowdenbeath	9	(2)
1925	→ Armadale (loan)		
1925–1926	Coventry City	40	(25)
1926	Springfield Babes	13	(7)
1926–1927	Fall River	20	(15)
1927–1928	New Bedford Whalers	48	(28)
1928–1930	Providence F.C.	65	(65)
1930	New Bedford Whalers	20	(21)
1930	Brooklyn Wanderers	13	(5)
1931	Fall River	17	(11)
- New York Nationals

Managerial career
- Providence Gold Bugs (player-manager)
- Cowdenbeath (caretaker)
- * Club domestic league appearances and goals

William Paterson (5 March 1897 – 31 July 1970) was a Scottish professional footballer who played as a centre forward. He began his career in Scotland in the 1910s and switched to English football twice. In 1926, he joined the American Soccer League where he led the league in scoring in the fall 1929 season.

== Career ==
Known as either Bill or Willie, Paterson spent time with Cowdenbeath and Rangers in Scotland before moving to Derby County of The Football League in 1921. He spent two seasons with Derby, where he was relegated from the First Division in 1921, before rejoining Cowdenbeath. He also spent time with Armadale. He then played with Coventry City during the 1925–26 season.

In the fall of 1926, he moved to the United States where he signed with the Springfield Babes of the American Soccer League. Paterson played only 13 games of the 1925–26 season with Springfield before jumping to the Fall River, where he was reunited with the Egyptian Tewfik Abdullah with whom he played at Derby County, for 20 games. He did not finish the season with Fall River, but moved to the New Bedford Whalers for seven games. He spent the full 1927–28 season in New Bedford, but was transferred to the Providence Gold Bugs seven games into the 1928–29 season and would serve the club as player-manager. He finished the 1929 fall season as the league's leading scorer with 27 goals in 22 games. In 1930, Paterson began the season with the New Bedford Whalers only to jump to the Brooklyn Wanderers. He then played the fall 1931 season with Fall River.

== Personal life ==
Paterson was the son of football manager Sandy Paterson and played under his father's management at Cowdenbeath. He had a half brother Archie Paterson who was also a footballer. He served as a gunner in the Royal Field Artillery during the First World War and served overseas before being demobbed in 1919.
