= Tom Florie =

American soccer player (1897–1966)

Tommy Florie

Personal information
- Full name: Thomas Florie
- Date of birth: September 6, 1897
- Place of birth: Harrison, New Jersey, U.S.
- Date of death: April 26, 1966 (aged 68)
- Place of death: North Providence, Rhode Island, U.S.
- Position: Forward

Senior career*
| Years | Team | Apps | (Gls) |
| 1921–1922 | Harrison S.C. | 3 | (0) |
| 1922–1924 | American | | |
| 1924–1928 | Providence F.C. | 166 | (63) |
| 1928–1931 | New Bedford Whalers II | 121 | (47) |
| Spring 1931 | → Fall River F.C. | 6 | (1) |
| Fall 1931–1932 | → New Bedford Whalers III | 19 | (15) |
| 1932–1934 | Pawtucket Rangers | | |
| 1934 | Pawtucket F.C. | | |

International career
| 1925–1934 | United States | 8 | (2) |
Medal record
Men's soccer
Representing United States
FIFA World Cup
| Third place | 1930 Uruguay |
- * Club domestic league appearances and goals

Thomas Florie (September 6, 1897 – April 26, 1966) was an American soccer forward. He played in both the first and second iterations of the American Soccer League, winning two National Challenge Cup titles. Florie was also a member of the United States men's national soccer team and represented the U.S. at the 1930 and 1934 FIFA World Cup tournaments. He was inducted into the National Soccer Hall of Fame in 1986.

== Early career ==
Born in New Jersey to Italian immigrant parents, Florie played soccer as a youth, but his service in the Navy during World War I delayed the start of his professional career. In 1922, Florie signed with Harrison S.C. of the American Soccer League. However, he appeared in only three games before leaving Harrison to play for American A.A. in the West Hudson Amateur League.

== American Soccer League ==
In 1924, Florie returned to the ASL when he signed with Providence F.C. He quickly established himself as one of the top wing forwards in the league. In 1928, he began the season with Providence, now known as the Gold Bugs, before moving to New Bedford Whalers II. He later joined Fall River F.C., but the team lasted only the spring season before merging with the New York Yankees to become New Bedford Whalers III. In 1932, the Whalers defeated Stix, Baer and Fuller F.C., 8–5 on aggregate in the National Challenge Cup final, with Florie scoring one goal in each of the two games. Despite this victory, the Whalers collapsed that fall, followed soon after by the entire league. Florie then moved to the Pawtucket Rangers, which had joined the second American Soccer League. In 1934, Florie was on the losing side in the National Challenge Cup when the Rangers fell to Stix, Baer and Fuller in three games. By that time, the Rangers had left the ASL. In 1941, Florie won his second National Challenge Cup when Pawtucket F.C. defeated Detroit Chrysler, 8–5 on aggregate, with Florie scoring one goal.

== National team ==
Florie earned eight caps, scoring two goals, with the U.S. national team from 1925 to 1934. His first cap came in a 1–0 loss to Canada on June 27, 1925. His second cap came a year later in a 6–2 victory over Canada, during which Florie scored. Florie was not called up for the national team at the 1928 Olympics but was selected for the 1930 FIFA World Cup. He was named team captain as the U.S. reached the semifinals before falling to Argentina. His last appearance for the national team was in the first-round loss to Italy at the 1934 FIFA World Cup.

Florie was inducted into the National Soccer Hall of Fame in 1986.

=== International goals ===
United States' goal tally first

| # | Date | Venue | Opponent | Score | Result | Competition |
|---|---|---|---|---|---|---|
| 1. | November 6, 1926 | Brooklyn, United States | Canada | 2–0 | 6–2 | Friendly |
| 2. | July 13, 1930 | Estadio Gran Parque Central, Montevideo, Uruguay | Belgium | 2–0 | 3–0 | 1930 FIFA World Cup |
