= Shamus O'Brien (soccer) =

American-Scottish soccer player (1907-1981)

Personal information
- Full name: William Shamus O'Brien
- Date of birth: November 29, 1907
- Place of birth: Neilston, Scotland
- Date of death: November 28, 1981 (aged 73)
- Place of death: Bangor, Maine, United States
- Position: Inside left

Youth career
- –1925: Ryerson Juniors
- 1925: Hartley

Senior career*
| Years | Team | Apps | (Gls) |
| 1925–1929 | New York Giants | 73 | (26) |
| 1929 | New York Nationals | 1 | (0) |
| 1929–1930 | New York Giants | 27 | (7) |
| 1930 | → New York Soccer Club | 24 | (3) |
| 1931–1932 | New York Giants | | |
| 1932–1933 | New York Americans | | |
| 1933–1938 | Kearny Irish Americans | | |
- * Club domestic league appearances and goals

William Shamus O'Brien (November 29, 1907 – November 28, 1981) was an American-Scottish soccer inside left. During his Hall of Fame career, O'Brien spent eight seasons in the first American Soccer League and another five in the second American Soccer League.

== Youth ==
While born in Scotland, O'Brien's family immigrated to the United States when he was eleven. They initially settled in Newport News, Virginia when his father was hired by the Newport News Shipbuilding and Drydock Company. However, the family did not remain in Virginia, but moved to Kearny, New Jersey where O'Brien was immersed in one of the country's most productive soccer regions. He began his career with Ryerson Juniors, winning the 1925 New Jersey state cup. He then briefly moved to Hartley before turning professional in the fall of 1925.

== Professional ==
In 1925, the New York Giants of the American Soccer League signed O'Brien. In 1928, the Giants, along with two other teams from the ASL, were suspended from the league for playing National Challenge Cup matches. The suspension was part of the Soccer Wars which pitted the ASL and the U.S. Soccer Football Association for control of professional soccer in the U.S. When the ASL boycotted the National Cup, the Giants defied the league and played its games anyway, leading to its suspension. USSFA then assisted the three suspended ASL clubs to merge with several teams from the Southern New York Soccer Association to form the Eastern Soccer League. O'Brien and the Giants played the 1928–29 season in the ESL before returning to the ASL in the fall of 1929. However, he also played one game with the New York Nationals. In 1930 the owner of the Giants was forced to sell the club as he also owned New York Hakoah, another ASL team. Under the new ownership, the Giants became the New York Soccer Club. In the spring of 1931, O'Brien moved to the second New York Giants. This version of the Giants was in no way related to the earlier Giants. This Giants team folded at the end of the 1931–32 season and O'Brien moved to the New York Americans. The first American Soccer League finally collapsed in 1933, to be replaced by the second ASL. With the change in league, O'Brien left the Americans to sign with the Kearny Irish Americans in 1933. The Irish-Americans won the 1933–34 league titles before becoming known as the Kearny Irish. O'Brien retired from playing professionally in 1938.

Although selected for the United States team to compete in the first World Cup, he had to decline the offer because at that time he was not a U.S. citizen.

O'Brien was inducted into the National Soccer Hall of Fame in 1990.
