= Jimmy McAuley =

Irish footballer (born 1901)

Personal information
- Date of birth: 8 February 1901
- Place of birth: Newtownards, Ireland
- Date of death: 2 June 1944 (aged 43)
- Place of death: Fall River, Massachusetts, United States
- Position: Inside forward

Senior career*
Years	Team	Apps	(Gls)
- Ards
1927	Philadelphia Celtic	8	(1)
1927–1930	Fall River	79	(18)
1928–1929	→ J&P Coats (loan)	20	(5)
1930	Pawtucket Rangers		
- * Club domestic league appearances and goals

James G. Macauley (8 February 1901 – 6 January 1944) was an Irish football (soccer) inside forward who played professionally in Ireland and the United States.

McAuley is known to have played for Ards F.C. in the Irish League. In 1927, he signed with Philadelphia Celtic of the American Soccer League. Previously known as the Philadelphia Field Club, the team had just been by a new ownership group and spent heavily on Irish players, but lasted only ten games before being suspended by the league for financial irregularities. McAuley then moved to the Fall River for the last twenty-two games of the season. He began the 1928–29 season in Fall River before going on loan to J&P Coats. He was back in Fall River the next season and played there through the 1929–30 season. In March 1930, the 'Marksmen' defeated Cleveland Bruell Insurance in the 1930 National Challenge Cup. In the first game, McAuley scored a hat trick as Fall River easily disposed of Cleveland by a score of 7–2. In the fall of 1930 he moved to Pawtucket Rangers (the new identity of the J&P Coats team) and played with them through at least 1931. He remained in the New England area and died in 1944.
