= George Moorhouse =

American soccer player

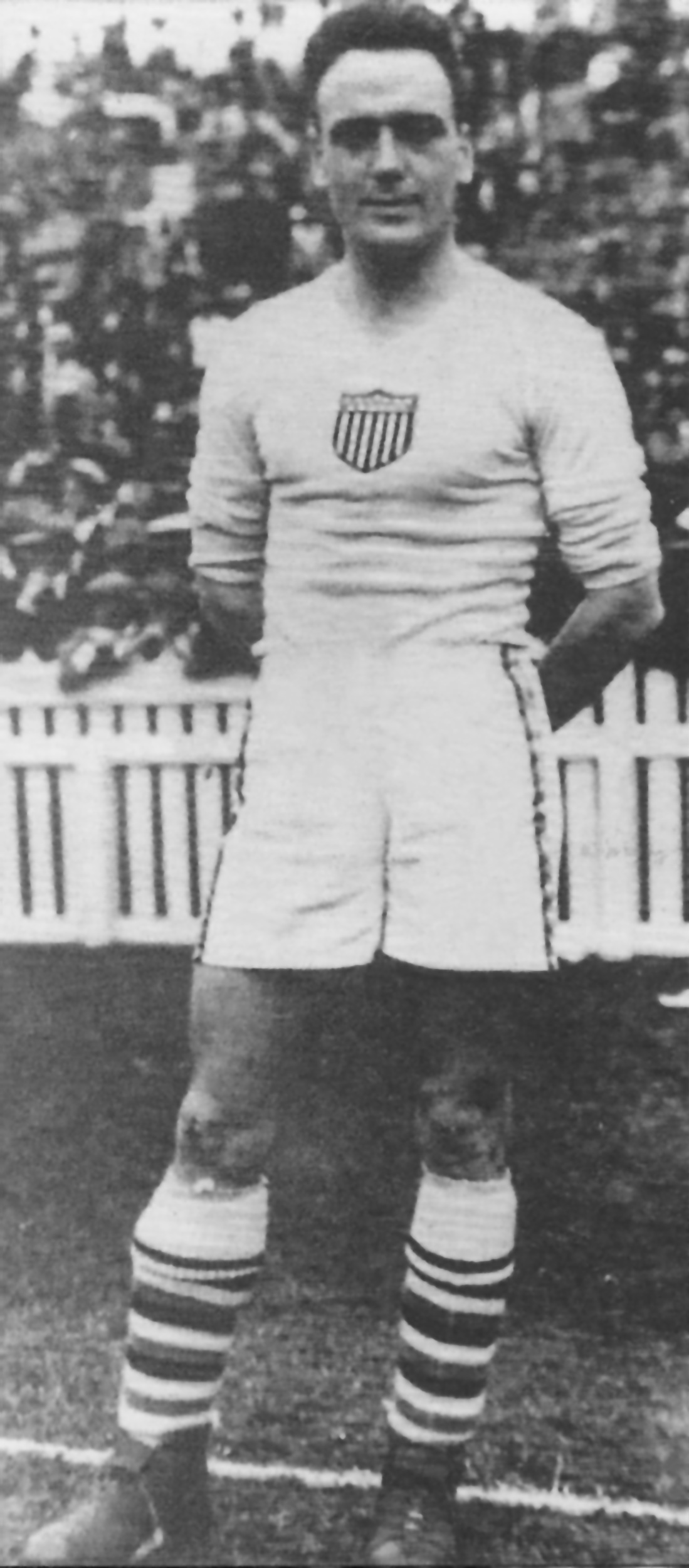

Personal information
- Full name: George Moorhouse
- Date of birth: April 4, 1901
- Place of birth: Liverpool, England
- Date of death: October 12, 1943 (aged 42)
- Place of death: Long Beach, New York, U.S.
- Position: Left back

Senior career*
Years	Team	Apps	(Gls)
1921–1923	Tranmere Rovers	2	(0)
1923	Montreal CPR		
1923	Brooklyn Wanderers	3	(0)
1923–1930	New York Giants	203	(32)
1930	→ New York Soccer Club	25	(2)
1931	→ New York Yankees	14	(6)
1931–1937	New York Americans		

International career
1926–1934	United States	7	(0)
Medal record
Men's soccer
Representing United States
FIFA World Cup
Third place	1930 Uruguay
- * Club domestic league appearances and goals

George Moorhouse (April 4, 1901 – October 12, 1943) was a soccer player who was the first native of England to appear in a FIFA World Cup (albeit as a member of the U.S. team rather than for England). He spent most of his playing career in the United States and earned seven caps with the U.S. national team. He was a member of the U.S. teams at the 1930 FIFA World Cup and 1934 FIFA World Cup. Moorhouse was inducted into the National Soccer Hall of Fame in 1986.

== Club career ==
A native of England, Moorhouse served in the British Merchant Marine during the First World War. After the war, he decided to try his luck in soccer. Predominantly left sided, Moorhouse had an unsuccessful trial with Leeds United. However, he did play two first team matches (December 26, 1921, versus Ashington and January 28, 1922, versus Accrington Stanley) whilst with Tranmere Rovers in the old Third Division North during the 1921-22 season. He then played with the Rovers' reserve team in the Cheshire League.

In 1923 he emigrated to Canada, eventually gaining a position with the Montreal Canadian Pacific Railway team. He spent only a few months with Montreal before transferring to the Brooklyn Wanderers of the American Soccer League (ASL). He played in only three games before moving to New York Giants where he remained for the next seven seasons, scoring 45 goals in over 250 games. In 1928, the Giants were expelled from the ASL during the "Soccer War" and Moorhouse remained with them during their season and a half in the Eastern Professional Soccer League. In 1929, Moorhouse and the Giants returned to the ASL. In the summer of 1930, the Giants were sold to new ownership which renamed the team the New York Soccer Club. Then in 1931, the team merged with the Fall River F.C. to become the New York Yankees for the 1931 spring season. In the fall of 1931, Moorhouse moved to the New York Americans. In 1933, the first ASL collapsed, to be replaced by a new league, also known as the American Soccer League. The Americans joined the new league and Moorehouse played with them until 1937 leading that side to two National Challenge Cup titles.

== National team ==
Moorhouse earned his first cap in a 6–1 victory over Canada on November 6, 1926. While he was not called into the team for either of the U.S. games in 1928, he was selected for the U.S. squad at the 1930 FIFA World Cup. The Americans accepted the offer from FIFA to participate in the World Cup and Moorhouse would play in all three matches in Uruguay as a defender. The first U.S. game, a 3–0 victory over Belgium on July 13, 1930, at Parque Central in Montevideo, made Moorhouse the first native-born Englishman to play in the World Cup. Moorhouse then played the next two matches as the U.S. went to the semifinals only to fall to Argentina in a particularly physical game. Several U.S. players were injured and the team finished with only eight fit field players and a lame goalkeeper as substitutes were not allowed.

The U.S. did not have any international matches until the 1934 FIFA World Cup in Italy. Moorhouse was selected as team captain for the cup. Because the U.S. had applied late for entry into the Cup, the team had to play a qualification match against Mexico in Italy. The U.S. won, 4–2, but was eliminated in the first round by Italy.

He was inducted into the National Soccer Hall of Fame in 1986.

== Date of death ==
While the National Soccer Hall of Fame lists Moorhouse's date of death as July 13, 1982, several other sources have conflicting information. Colin Jose, who has served as a historian with the Hall of Fame, lists the date as October 12, 1943, in his history of the American Soccer League. Finally, Dave Litterer, who writes extensively on U.S. soccer, noted that in 1943, "ASL veterans mourned the passing of George Moorhouse, one of its premier players during the 1930s and a frequent participant with the National team, having earned a cap in every one of its games between 1930 and 1938."
