= Bridgeport Hungaria =

Former soccer club in Pennsylvania

Bridgeport Hungaria was an American soccer club based in Bridgeport, Pennsylvania that was a member of the American Soccer League.

The team was formed to replace the Newark Skeeters who had folded before the merger of the ASL and the Eastern Soccer League. After 10 games, the club moved to Newark, New Jersey but folded after only five more games. On January 26, 1930, Hungaria lost, 4–0, to the New Bedford Whalers in the first round of the National Challenge Cup.

== Year-by-year ==
| Year | Division | League | Reg. season | Playoffs | National Cup |
|---|---|---|---|---|---|
| 1930 | 1 | ACL (ASL) | 10th (Spring) | No playoff | First round |
