= Boston Bears (soccer) =

The Boston Bears were a member of the American Soccer League, competing in 1931 and 1932. The club had originally been known as the Boston Soccer Club, and had competed in the ASL from 1924 to 1929, as well as the International Soccer League from 1926. After suspending operations during the 1929–1930 season, the club was relaunched and operated as the Boston Bears, until it folded in 1933.

== History ==
In 1931, the newly renamed club signed new players including Charley O'Hare, a former Wonder Workers star who was released by Brittain Fall River, and Sammy Brown. Other players included Billy Stevenson, who had previously played one or two games with the old Wonder Workers team.

On March 30, 1931, the Bears suffered its worst defeat of the season, losing to the New York Giants at the Polo Grounds 8–1, in front of a crowd of 1500.

== Year-by-year ==
Year	Division	League	Reg. season	Playoffs	U.S. Open Cup	Ref.
Spring 1931	1	ASL	9th	Did not qualify	Did not enter	
Fall 1931	1	ASL	5th	N/A	N/A	
Spring 1932	1	ASL	3rd	No playoff	?	
Fall 1932	1	ASL	7th	No playoff	?	
