= Bob McIntyre (soccer) =

Scottish-American soccer player

Personal information
- Full name: Robert McIntyre
- Date of birth: 15 May 1904
- Place of birth: Cambuslang, Scotland
- Date of death: 18 February 1998 (aged 93)
- Place of death: USA
- Position: Centre forward

Youth career
- Renfrew Juniors

Senior career*
Years	Team	Apps	(Gls)
- Lausitania Recreation
1930–1931	Pawtucket Rangers	65	(61)
- * Club domestic league appearances and goals

Robert McIntyre (15 May 1904 – 18 February 1998) was a Scottish-American soccer center forward who spent two years in the American Soccer League, leading the league in scoring during the spring 1931 season.

Born in Cambuslang, Scotland, McIntyre began playing soccer with Renfrew Juniors. In 1923, he moved to the United States, settling in Boston. When he arrived, he joined the amateur Lusitania Recreation club. In 1930, he signed with the professional Pawtucket Rangers of the American Soccer League. He had an immediate impact, scoring twenty-three goals in thirty-one games in the fall 1930 season. That was good enough to take second in the league scoring table. In the spring of 1931, he played only eighteen games, but again scored twenty-three goals, taking the league scoring title. That fall, he added another fifteen goals in sixteen games.

In 1939, a Bob McIntyre is listed as playing in the second American Soccer League, but this may be a different man as there were three Bob McIntyres playing during the last few seasons in the first ASL.
