= Newark Americans =

American professional soccer club (1930–1932)

Newark Americans were a team in the first American Soccer League. They were founded in 1930, but folded following the spring 1932 season. The team's manager was Bill Miller. In January 1932, the team made it to the semifinals of the National Challenge Cup.

== Year-by-year ==
Year	Division	League	Reg. season	Playoffs	U.S. Open Cup
Fall 1930	1	ASL	3rd	No playoff	N/A
Spring 1931	1	ASL	7th	Did not qualify	Semifinals
Fall 1931	1	ASL	7th	N/A	
Spring 1932	1	ASL	?	No playoff	Quarterfinals
