= Billy Gonsalves =

American soccer player

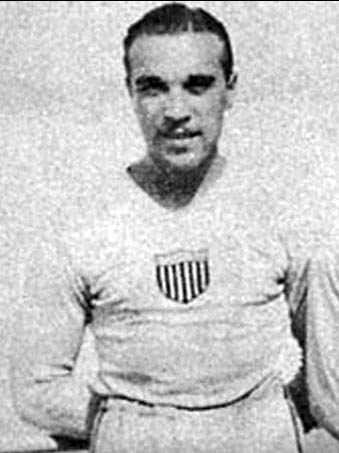
- Gonsalves with the US team in 1930

Personal information
- Full name: Adelino William Gonsalves
- Date of birth: August 10, 1908
- Place of birth: Portsmouth, Rhode Island, U.S.
- Date of death: July 17, 1977 (aged 68)
- Place of death: Kearny, New Jersey, U.S.
- Height: 6 ft 2 in (1.88 m)
- Positions: Inside left; center half

Youth career
- Pioneer
- Charlton Mill
- Liberal.

Senior career*
Years	Team	Apps	(Gls)
1926–1927	Lusitania Recreation Club	?	(?)
1927–1929	Boston Soccer Club	52	(16)
1929–1932	Fall River F.C.	116	(69)
1932	→ Fall River F.C.	12	(7)
1933–1937	St. Louis Central Breweries	?	(13)
1937–1938	Beltmar Drug	?	(?)
1938	South Side Radio	?	(?)
1938–1939	Chicago Manhattan Beer	?	(?)
1940–1941	Healy F.C.	19	(16)
1941–1942	Kearny Scots		
1942–1948	Brooklyn Hispano		
1948–1952	Newark F.C.		

International career
1930–1934	United States	6	(1)
Medal record
Men's soccer
Representing United States
FIFA World Cup
Third place	1930 Uruguay
- * Club domestic league appearances and goals

Adelino William Gonsalves (Note: Sometimes spelled in the Portuguese form, Gonçalves) (August 10, 1908 – July 17, 1977) was an American soccer player, sometimes described as the "Babe Ruth of American Soccer". He spent over 25 years playing in various American professional leagues and was a member of the U.S. squad at the FIFA World Cup in 1930 and 1934. He is a member of the National Soccer Hall of Fame.

== Youth ==
Gonsalves spent his early years in Fall River, Massachusetts. He was the seventh of nine children born to Agostinho and Rosa Gonçalves (who had immigrated from Portugal two years before his birth). An excellent athlete, Gonsalves boxed and played both baseball and soccer as a boy. When he was fourteen, Gonsalves began playing for Pioneer, a local amateur team. He then went on to play for Charlton Mill and Liberal. Gonsalves grew in prominence in the local leagues. In 1926, he signed with Lusitania Recreation Club of East Cambridge, Massachusetts. In 1927, Lusitania won both the Boston city and District League titles.

== Professional career ==
In 1927, Boston Soccer Club ("Wonder Workers") of the American Soccer League (ASL) signed Gonsalves. Nineteen years old at the time, Gonsalves joined a team which had taken second in the ASL the previous season and was stocked with talented international players. Finding it difficult to break into the starting lineup, Gonsalves did not play a game with Boston until Christmas Eve. However, given the chance, he grabbed it and scored a goal two minutes later. He went on to find the net six times in his next twenty games. That season the Wonder Workers also took the league title.

Gonsalves spent one more season with the 'Wonder Workers' before moving to the Fall River F.C. of his hometown in 1929. From the time he joined the 'Marksmen' until the team merged with the New York Soccer Club in the summer of 1930 to form the New York Yankees, Gonsalves played seventy-five games and scored forty-nine goals. Additionally, he was the team's assists leader.

While playing with the 'Marksmen', Gonsalves formed a lethal striking partnership with another local player, Bert Patenaude. The two led Fall River to the National Challenge Cup title in 1930 and 1931. Overall, Gonslaves won the tournament a record eight times.

The onset of the Great Depression and the Soccer Wars had taken a toll on the ASL and teams began to merge or fold. The 'Marksmen', one of the strongest ASL teams, had merged with the New York Soccer Club to form the New York Yankees in 1930. Then in 1931, the Yankees moved to New Bedford, Massachusetts, where the team took up the name of the defunct New Bedford Whalers. In 1932, the team moved, this time back to Fall River where it was known as Fall River F.C.

By this time the American Soccer League was collapsing and Gonsalves began looking for other playing opportunities. In 1933 Alex McNab, a former teammate who was coaching Stix, Baer and Fuller F.C. of the St. Louis Soccer League contacted Gonsalves and offered him a contract. Gonsalves took the opportunity and moved west. That year, Gonsalves added another National Cup title to his resume, this time with his new team. Gonsalves spent the 1933–1934 season with Stix, Baer and Fuller, winning the league title. At the end of the season, he joined the U.S. national team for the 1934 FIFA World Cup in Italy.

On his return to St. Louis, Gonsalves found that McNab had moved to a new team, St. Louis Central Breweries F.C. Gonsalves made the move as well and spent the 1934–1935 season with Central Breweries, winning the league title and the 1935 National Cup. In 1935, Gonsalves moved, this time to the St. Louis Shamrocks. The Shamrocks went to both the 1936 and 1937 National Cup championships, but lost both times. In October 1937, Gonsalves quit the Shamrocks and signed with St. Patrick's. However, Shamrocks sued St. Patrick's and St. Patrick's settled out of court by agreeing to a player trade. Despite the agreement, Gonsalves decided not to play for either team and instead signed with Beltmars in the semi-professional second division St. Louis Municipal League. In February 1938, Gonsalves was back in the SLSL with South Side Radio. He finished the season with the South Siders before moving to Chicago Manhattan Beer. Then in 1940, he moved back east, joining Healy F.C. of the National Soccer League of New York, winning the 1941 league title. In 1941, he moved, this time to the Kearny Scots of the second American Soccer League (ASL) which was created in 1933 following the collapse of the first ASL. Gonsalves spent only one season with the Scots before moving to Brooklyn Hispano. Uncharacteristically for him, Gonsalves spent the next five seasons with Brooklyn. In his first season with Brooklyn, he scored eight goals in sixteen games. Brooklyn also won the National Challenge Cup in 1943 and 1944.

In 1947, Gonsalves left Hispano to play for the Newark Germans of the lower division German American Soccer League. In 1948, the team became known simply as Newark F.C. Gonsalves remained with the team until his retirement from playing professionally in 1952.

According to Steve Holroyd, in a professional career spanning twenty-five years, "Gonsalves was also the consummate gentleman on the pitch: legend has it he was never cautioned or ejected from any match for rough play or ungentlemanly conduct."

== National team ==
Gonsalves played six times for the United States, including the first two FIFA World Cups in 1930 and 1934. He scored one goal for the U.S. national team.

Gonsalves was part of the inaugural induction class into the United States National Soccer Hall of Fame in 1950.
