= Sam Mark =

American soccer club owner (1896–1980)

Samuel Mark (born Markelevich; September 22, 1896 – August 9, 1980) was an American soccer club owner. During the 1920s and early 1930s he was the owner of Fall River FC, often referred to as the Marksmen, one of the era's most successful teams. Mark's continued to own the team after it relocated and became the New York Yankees and then New Bedford Whalers. He also briefly owned Boston Soccer Club. He had played guard for the Massachusetts American Legion basketball team.

== Early life ==
Mark was born in Fall River, Massachusetts to Ukrainian Jewish immigrants from Kyiv. His father, Mandel, changed the family surname to Mark in 1916 because of difficulties in spelling and pronouncing it. Mark went to B.M.C. Durfee High School, where he excelled in multiple sports.

== Career ==
=== Fall River F.C. ===
Mark initially established himself as a basketball and baseball promoter in Massachusetts and as well as owning several soccer clubs he also owned a semi-professional baseball team. He was not originally a soccer fan but was aware of the large crowds that Fall River Rovers attracted. In 1922 he took over the American Soccer League's Fall River franchise. Mark was willing to invest in the club and one of his first moves was to build Mark's Stadium in North Tiverton, Rhode Island. Because the stadium was just over the Massachusetts border, the club was able to get round the state's Blue Laws and play on a Sunday. It is also one of the earliest examples of a soccer-specific stadium in the United States.

Under Sam Mark, Fall River F.C. became one of the most successful soccer clubs in the United States. During the 1920s and early 1930s they won the American Soccer League on seven occasions. They also won the National Challenge Cup four times. In 1924 they also won the first ASL / Challenge Cup double and were subsequently the American soccer champions three times in succession. Between 1929 and 1930 they won a further four titles in a row. In 1930 they also completed a treble, winning the ASL title, the Challenge Cup and the Lewis Cup.

=== Soccer War ===
In 1929 the American Soccer League and the United States Football Association became involved in a power struggle sometimes referred to as the Soccer Wars. This resulted in the emergence of two rival leagues - the ASL and Eastern Soccer League. Many clubs suffered financially and during the dispute Mark's took over the struggling Boston Soccer Club. He also acted as a mediator between the two rival leagues and helped negotiate a merger. However the rules of the new Atlantic Coast League forbid the ownership of two or more clubs. Mark decided to sell the Boston club but unable to find a buyer, he was forced to dissolve the team after just 4 games of the Spring 1930 season.

=== New York Yankees ===
By 1931 the effects of the Soccer Wars and the Great Depression had seen attendances fall at Mark's Stadium. As a result, Mark moved Fall River F.C. to New York, hoping that a new market there would be more lucrative. Once there he merged the club with New York Soccer Club and named them the New York Yankees. Before the merger was finalized, however, Fall River F.C. had entered the National Challenge Cup and Mark was unable to re-register them as the Yankees. As a result, the Spring 1931 season saw them continue to play in the Challenge Cup as the Fall River F.C. while at the same time playing as the New York Yankees in the American Soccer League. While the Yankees only managed to finish third in the ASL, the Marksmen won the cup.

=== New Bedford Whalers ===
Despite winning the National Challenge Cup, the relocation to New York was not a financial success and for the Fall 1931 season Mark relocated the New York Yankees to New Bedford, Massachusetts where they merged with Fall River F.C. and became the New Bedford Whalers. This new team were the American Soccer League champions for the Fall 1931 and Spring 1932 seasons but then folded during the Fall 1932 season.

=== Later years ===
The demise of the New Bedford Whalers coincided with the collapse of the original American Soccer League. Mark subsequently turned his back on the game and became a nightclub owner. However, by 1955 he had relocated to Los Angeles where he helped form Los Angeles Kickers, one of the city's first professional soccer teams. Mark used his contacts in Fall River, Massachusetts to recruit players from his former hometown.
