= 1932 American Soccer League =

American Soccer League -1932 Season-
- Season: 1932
- Champions: New Bedford Whalers

Statistics of American Soccer League in the 1932 season.

== Overview ==
The history of the American Soccer League begins to become difficult to determine at this point. It appears the league began a 1932 season in the spring of 1932. Whether this season as completed or abandoned during the season is unclear from the records. In October 1932, the league resumed play with a vastly different line-up of teams from its spring season.

== League standings ==
Place	Team	GP	W	D	L	GF	GA	Points
1	New Bedford Whalers	6	3	2	1			8
2	Hakoah All-Stars	6	3	1	2			7
3	Boston Bears	6	1	4	1			5
4	Pawtucket Rangers	6	0	3	3			3
5	New York Americans	1	0	1	0			1
6	New York Giants	0	0	0	0			0
7	Newark Americans	0	0	0	0			0
