= Fall River F.C. (1922–1931) =

- Full name: Fall River Football Club
- Nicknames: Marksmen, Mark's men
- Founded: 1922
- Dissolved: 1931; 95 years ago
- Stadium: Mark's Stadium; North Tiverton, Rhode Island
- Capacity: 15,000
- Owner: Sam Mark
- Chairman: Sam Mark
- League: American Soccer League
- 1931: 3rd
Home colors

Fall River F.C. was an American soccer club based in Fall River, Massachusetts. During the 1920s and early 1930s they were one of the most successful soccer clubs in the United States, winning the American Soccer League on six occasions. They also won the National Challenge Cup four times. In 1924 they won the first ASL / Challenge Cup double and were subsequently the American soccer champions three times in succession. Between 1928 and 1930 they won a further three titles in a row. In 1930 they completed a treble, winning the ASL title, the Challenge Cup and the Lewis Cup. The same year they also toured Central Europe.

The 'Marksmen' played their home games at Mark's Stadium, one of the earliest examples of a soccer-specific stadium in the United States. In 1931 the franchise relocated and merged twice. They first moved to New York, where they merged with New York Soccer Club and became the New York Yankees. They actually won their fourth National Challenge Cup after they became the Yankees, but due to complications following the merger it was credited to the 'Marksmen'. The Yankees later moved to New Bedford, Massachusetts, where they merged with Fall River F.C. to become the New Bedford Whalers.

== History ==
=== Early years ===
In 1921 the Southern New England Soccer League and the National Association Football League effectively merged to form the American Soccer League. A new team Fall River United were formed to enter the ASL. During the inaugural season United struggled, finishing sixth out of eight, and were on the verge of folding. After the first ASL season United could not agree to terms on a lease for their playing grounds for the following season. Subsequently, a joint bid with United and the Fall River Rovers to continue in the ASL was denied while Sam Mark's bid was accepted by the league. He built a new stadium at Tiverton, RI to host his new team Fall River F.C.

Mark was willing to invest in the club and one of his first moves was to build the team its own stadium. Mark's Stadium was located in North Tiverton, Rhode Island, just over the Massachusetts border from Fall River. As a result, the club was now able circumvent the Massachusetts' Blue Laws and play on a Sunday. Crucially, Mark also managed to recruit Harold Brittan from Bethlehem Steel. During the 1922–23 season Brittan scored 19 goals in 23 games and subsequently went on to serve the 'Marksmen' for nearly a decade as a player, coach and manager. Other notable signings included winger James White and full-back Tommy Martin, both from Motherwell, full-back Charlie McGill from Third Lanark and wing-half Bill McPherson from Beith. Together with goalkeeper Findlay Kerr, who joined the following season, White, McGill and McPherson would become the backbone of the 'Marksmen' team throughout its short history.

=== Golden Era ===
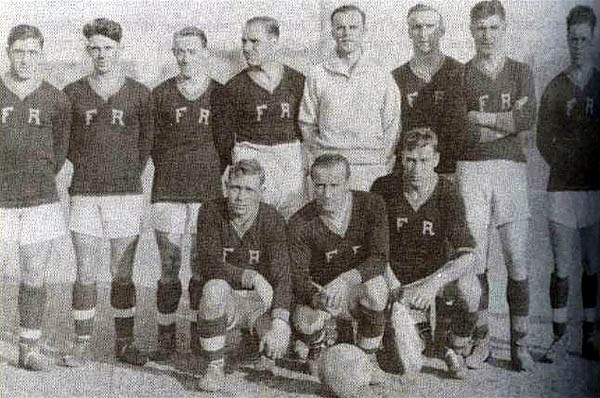
Fall River F.C. squad in 1921

The 1920s and early 1930s are sometimes described as the Golden Era of U.S. soccer and it was Fall River F.C. that emerged as the era's dominant team. During the 1923–24 season the 'Marksmen' completely dominated the league. They eventually won their first league title, finishing 6 points clear of Bethlehem Steel. Harold Brittan again spearheaded the offense, scoring 15 goals. However the strength of the team lay in a strong defense which included Ned Tate and Findlay Kerr, who kept an incredible 14 clean sheets during the league season. The season also saw the 'Marksmen' go on to complete the first ASL / National Challenge Cup double. In the semi-final of the Challenge Cup, the 'Marksmen' defeated the 'Steelmen' 2–0 at Dexter Park in front of 20,000 fans. On March 30, 1924, the final attracted 14,000 fans to the High School Field in St. Louis, Missouri, where they witnessed the 'Marksmen' defeat St. Louis Vesper Buick 4–2. The only disappointment for the Marksmen during the season came when they lost 1–0 to the 'Steelmen' in the final of the American Cup.

The 'Marksmen' went on to win further ASL titles in 1924–25 and 1925–26, completing a three in a row sequence. They won it again in 1928–29 and then completed a four in a row when they won further titles in the Fall 1929, Spring 1930 and Fall 1930 seasons. On May 1, 1927, the Marksmen also won their second National Challenge Cup, defeating Holley Carburetor F.C. 7–0 before a crowd of 10,000 at the University of Detroit Stadium.

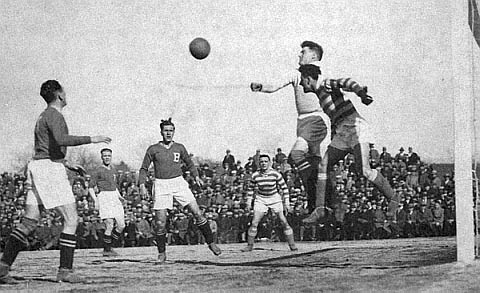
Fall River (red and white hoops shirt) v Bethlehem Steel match

From the beginning the 'Marksmen' regularly recruited Scottish Football League journeymen, sometimes directly from Scottish clubs but also from other ASL teams, most notably Bethlehem Steel. However two of their most notable players, Billy Gonsalves and Bert Patenaude, actually grew up in Fall River itself. Both players first established themselves at other ASL clubs – Gonsalves at Boston Soccer Club and Patenaude at Philadelphia Field Club – before forming a formidable partnership at the 'Marksmen'. In 1930, the duo played a major role in helping the 'Marksmen' win a treble. During the Spring 1930 season, when the ASL played as the Atlantic Coast League, they scored 44 league goals in 26 games as the Marksmen won another league title. In the 1930 National Challenge Cup the Marksmen defeated Cleveland Bruell Insurance in a two-leg final. They just about finished off the Cleveland team when they won the opening leg, 7–2, on March 30 at the Polo Grounds. Jimmy McAuley and Werner Nilsen each scored a hat-trick while Alex McNab scored the other Fall River goal. On April 6 at Luna Park in Cleveland, Fall River took the second leg, 2–1, with further goals from McNab and Bob McAuley, no relation to Jimmy. They completed the treble when they won the Lewis Cup defeating Hakoah All-Stars 2–1 and 3–0 in another two-legged final.

=== European Tours ===
Throughout their short history the Marksmen regularly provided opposition for touring European teams and, more often than not, they held their own. On September 19, 1926, the Marksmen beat Sparta Prague 3–2. On June 3, 1928, at Mark's Stadium, a capacity crowd of 15,000 saw goalkeeper Jimmy Douglas keep a clean sheet as the Marksmen held Rangers to a 0–0 tie. Then on August 26, 1928, at the same venue they beat an Italian League XI, playing as Palestra Italia, 4–2. In 1930 they played Rangers twice. On May 30 they lost 3–2 with Billy Gonsalves and Werner Nilsen scoring the Fall River goals. The goalkeeper that day was Johnny Reder who later played baseball with Boston Red Sox. However a few weeks later on June 22 they lost 6–1 at the Polo Grounds. Guest player Archie Stark scored the only goal for Fall River. In between these games they beat Kilmarnock 3–0 at Mark's Stadium on June 15. Stark scored the opening goal with Alex McNab and Bob McAuley adding the other two.

While teams from Europe regularly toured North America, it was rare for an ASL team to play overseas. However, in August 1930 the Marksmen toured Central Europe, playing six games in Czechoslovakia, Austria, and Hungary. The squad included, among others, Bill Harper, Alex McNab, Jerry Best and Werner Nilsen as well as veterans James White, Charlie McGill and Bill McPherson and guest player Archie Stark. Both Billy Gonsalves and Bert Patenaude were playing with the United States at the 1930 FIFA World Cup and did not travel. They opened the tour on August 20 with a 2–2 tie against Slavia Prague in front of a crowd of 18,000. This was the first of two games against Slavia. They lost the other 4–0 on August 28. They also played FK Austria Wien twice, losing the first game 6–0 on August 23 before winning the second 3–1 the following day. On August 30 they won their second game when they put three goals past ŠK Slovan Bratislava. The tour came to an end on August 31 when they lost 6–2 to Ferencvárosi TC. The tour ended early, and in dispute, with Fall River unhappy about their share of the gate receipts.

=== Fall River/Yankees ===
The 'Marksmen' returned from their European tour, and started the Fall 1930 season late, but that didn't stop them from winning their seventh league title, despite playing only 27 out of 30 games. However, by this stage the effects of the Great Depression had seen attendance fall at Mark's Stadium. As a result, Sam Mark moved the club to New York, hoping that a new market there would be more lucrative. Once there he merged the club with New York Soccer Club and renamed them the New York Yankees. Before the merger was finalized, however, Fall River F.C. had entered the 1931 National Challenge Cup and Mark was unable to re-register them as the Yankees. As a result, the Spring 1931 season saw them continue to play in the Challenge Cup as the Fall River F.C. while at the same time playing as the New York Yankees in the ASL. While the Yankees only managed to finish third in the ASL, the Marksmen won the cup. Largely on the goalscoring strength of Billy Gonsalves, with 9, and Bert Patenaude, with 13, they reached the final where they eventually beat Chicago Bricklayers in a final played as a three-game series.

The last of these three games is officially regarded as the last game the 'Marksmen' ever played. The first leg of the final was played on April 5 at the Polo Grounds, where the 'Marksmen' won 6–2, and seemingly established a clear lead. Patenaude scored five goals in that game while Bill McPherson added the other. A week later at Mills Stadium in Chicago, the Bricklayers kept the series alive by earning a 1–1 tie. This time Gonsalves got on the score sheet. Sparta Stadium in Chicago attracted 4,500 for the deciding game on April 19. The 'Marksmen' could only field 10 players after their captain, Alex McNab, broke his arm in a midweek friendly and the club had neglected to bring along any reserves. Despite this they still managed to win 2–0 with goals from Patenaude and Gordon Burness.

== Year-by-year ==
Season	Div.	League			National cups	
Season	Div.	Assoc.	Reg. season	Playoffs	Challenge Cup	American Cup
1922–23	1	ASL	3rd	did not enter	Second round	did not enter
1923–24	1	ASL	1st	Champion	Champion	Runner-up
1924–25	1	ASL	1st	Champion	did not enter	N/A
1925–26	1	ASL	1st	Champion	Second round	N/A
1926–27	1	ASL	3rd		Champion	N/A
1927–28	1	ASL	5th, 2nd (Note: Positions in first and second halves, respectively.)	Semifinals	Semifinals	N/A
1928–29	1	ASL	1st, 1st	Champion	did not enter	N/A
1929	1	ASL	1st	Champion	N/A	N/A
1930	1	ACL/ASL	1st, 1st	Champion	Champion	N/A
1931	1	ASL	5th, – (Note: Positions in first half; the team did not participate in second half.)	did not qualify	Champion	N/A

== Honors ==
- American Soccer League
  - Winners 1923–24, 1924–25, 1925–26, 1928–29, 1929, 1930: 6
- National Challenge Cup
  - Winners 1924, 1927, 1930, 1931: 4
- Lewis Cup
  - Winners 1930: 1
  - Runners Up 1925: 1
- American Cup
  - Runners Up 1924: 1

== Notable coaches ==
- (England) Harold Brittan: 1922–1926
- (England) Fred Morley
