= Fall River F.C. (1932) =

American soccer club

Fall River Football Club, was the name used by a United States soccer clubs, based in Fall River, Massachusetts. They played in the American Soccer League during the 1931 and 1932 season. The name is often used and is not to be confused with the Fall River F.C. team owned by Sam Mark.

== Fall River F.C. Spring 1931 ==
In 1931, after Mark relocated his team to New York and renamed them the New York Yankees, a group of Fall River businessmen, led by an ex-Marksmen player Harold Brittan, then bought Gold Bugs, moved them into Mark's Stadium, and renamed them Fall River F.C.

The new club played for just one season, Spring 1931, eventually finishing fifth. However, during their short existence they did win two notable prestige friendlies. On February 22, 1931, they beat Vélez Sársfield 5–2. Then on May 31 with a team that included Joe Kennaway, Bill Paterson and Tom Florie they beat Celtic 1–0. Kennaway subsequently signed for Celtic after impressing them with his performance in goal. By early 1931 the Great Depression had severely effected the stability of the ASL and several teams relocated, merged and even disappeared. On April 19, 1931, Fall River absorbed New Bedford Whalers. On May 31, 1931, Fall River defeated Celtic F.C. before a crowd of 7,000 at Mark's Stadium. The club folded after the first half of the season.

== Fall River 1932 ==
This Fall River soccer team played during the Fall 1932 American Soccer League season. This team was put together by manager Tec White. New Bedford Whalers, the successor team of both the earlier Fall River F.C./Providence F.C. and the 'Marksmen', also began the Fall 1932 season but they only survived for six games before folding. The team began the season with the following lineup: goalkeeper John Souza, fullbacks Chick Rebello and Bert Campbell, halfbacks Dinny Doyle, John Dubienny, and John Caldwell, forwards Jim White, Myrtle, Fred Wall, Billy Gonsalves and Joe Czapya with Ralph and Chet Varanese as reserves. Billy Gonsalves with the new Fall River club, scored 7 goals in 12 games, until he transferred to Stix Baer Fuller.

== Year-by-year ==
Year	Division	League	Reg. season	Playoffs	National Challenge Cup
Spring 1931	1	ASL	5th	No playoff	Did not enter
Fall 1932	1	ASL	Champion	No playoff	N/A

== Honors ==
Fall River F.C. II

- American Soccer League
  - Winners Fall 1932: 1
