= Providence F.C. =

American soccer club

The Providence Football Club was a member of the American Soccer League. They were renamed the Providence Gold Bugs before the spring half of the 1928–1929 season. In the fall of 1929, the team installed lights at its field, allowing for night games. The club won the American Soccer Association Cup in 1929.

After the fall 1930 season, the club was bought and became the Fall River F.C.

== History ==
Between 1924 and 1930 they played as the Providence F.C. in the American Soccer League. The club's primary venue was Kinsley Park, with games moving to the Cycledrome or the Lonsdale Avenue Pitch when their schedule conflicted with that of the Providence Grays. In 1931, after Sam Mark, owner of Fall River F.C., relocated his team to New York and renamed them the New York Yankees, a group of Fall River businessmen, led by an ex-Marksmen player Harold Brittan, then bought Gold Bugs, moved them into Mark's Stadium, and renamed them Fall River F.C.

== Year-by-year ==
Year	Division	League	Reg. season	Playoffs	National Cup
1924–1925	1	ASL	6th	No playoff	Did not enter
1925–1926	1	ASL	5th	No playoff	First round
1926–1927	1	ASL	8th	No playoff	Quarterfinals
1927–1928	1	ASL	7th (1st half); 6th (2nd half)	Did not qualify	Second round
1928–1929	1	ASL	4th (1st half); 2nd (2nd half)	No playoff	Did not enter
Fall 1929	1	ASL	2nd	No playoff	N/A
1930	1	ACL (ASL)	4th (spring); 6th (fall)	No playoff	Second round

== Honors ==
- League Champion

- Runner Up (1): 1929

- American Soccer Association Cup

- Winner (1): 1929

== Coaches ==
- Sam Fletcher: 1924-1929
