= New York Yankees (soccer) =

Defunct association football team

New York Yankees were a New York soccer team that played briefly in the American Soccer League. They were formed following the merger of Fall River F.C. and New York Soccer Club. Although the Yankees survived only a short time, they beat Celtic in a prestige friendly and effectively won the 1931 National Challenge Cup. However, due to complications over the merger their moment of glory was credited to Fall River F.C.

== History ==
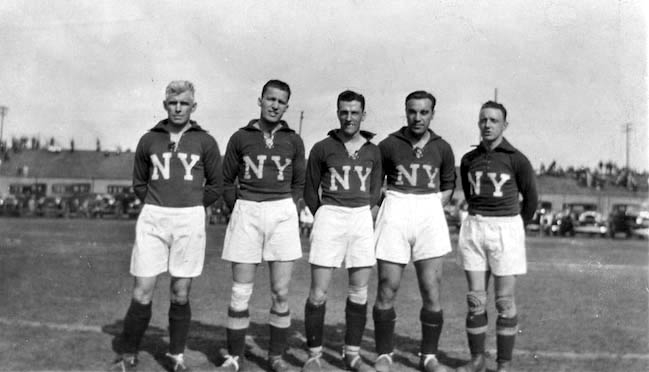
Players of the NY Yankees

Fall River F.C. were originally one of the most successful early United States soccer clubs. However, by 1931 they were suffering financially and Sam Mark, owner of the franchise, moved the club to New York, hoping that a new market there would be more lucrative. Once there he merged the club with New York Soccer Club and renamed them the Yankees. New York Soccer Club had previously played as New York Giants.

Before the merger was finalized however, Fall River F.C. had entered the 1931 National Challenge Cup. After the merger, the new club was unable to re-register for the competition, so they continued to play in the Challenge Cup as Fall River F.C. With a team featuring Billy Gonsalves and Bert Patenaude they eventually beat Chicago Bricklayers in a final played as a three-game series. At the same time they also competed in the Spring 1931 American Soccer League as the New York Yankees, finishing in third place.

In the summer of 1931, a Yankees team featuring Gonsalves, Patenaude and George Moorhouse twice played Celtic in friendlies. On May 30 at Fenway Park, Gonsalves scored a hat-trick as the Yankees won 4–3. However, on June 28 at Yankee Stadium, Celtic avenged the defeat and won 4–1. The relocation to New York was not a financial success and in Fall 1931, Sam Mark relocated his team once again, this time to New Bedford, Massachusetts, where they became New Bedford Whalers.

== Year-by-year ==
Year	Division	League	Reg. season	Playoffs	National Challenge Cup
Spring 1931	1	ASL	3rd	Did not qualify	Champion

== Honors ==
- National Challenge Cup
  - Winners 1931: 1
