= New York Soccer Club =

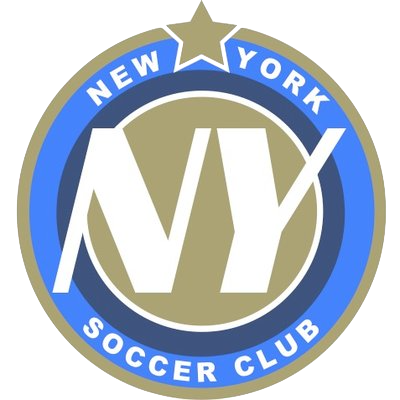

New York Soccer Club was the name of a New York soccer team that, in 1930, played briefly in the American Soccer League.

In 1923, New York fur merchant Maurice Vandeweghe - the father and grandfather of later basketball stars Ernie and Kiki Vandeweghe - bought the Paterson franchise of the ASL and moved the team to the Bronx New York. It played its matches mainly in the Bronx and some major games at the Polo Grounds. Vandeweghe originally renamed the team the New York National Giants, but in 1924, he changed it to New York Giants. Vandeweghe initially also owned 75% of the shares of New York Hakoah, which he had to sell due to regulations.

Between 1923 and 1930 they had been known as the New York Giants. In 1930 they merged with the Fall River F.C. to become the New York Yankees. Then in 1931 this club absorbed Fall River F.C. and moved to New Bedford, Massachusetts to become the New Bedford Whalers.

== Year-by-year ==
Year	Division	League	Reg. season	Playoffs	U.S. Open Cup
1930	1	ASL	5th (Fall)	Did not qualify	?
