= New Bedford Whalers =

- Full name: New Bedford Whalers
- Founded: 1913
- Dissolved: 1933
- Chairman: (United States) Sam Mark: 1931–1932
- League: SNESL: 1914–1918; American Soccer League: 1924–1932 → International Soccer League: 1926 → Eastern Soccer League: 1929

New Bedford Whalers was the name of three American soccer teams based in New Bedford, Massachusetts. The first Whalers played in the Southern New England Soccer League between 1914 and 1918. The second Whalers played in the American Soccer League between 1924 and 1931 before merging into Fall River F.C. The third Whalers were then formed when Fall River merged with New York Yankees. They played in the ASL between 1931 and 1932.

== New Bedford Whalers I ==
Founded in September 1913, the first Whalers originally played as New Bedford F.C. and played in the Southern New England Soccer League between 1914 and 1918. Immediately after their founding, they entered the 1913–14 National Challenge Cup. They went to the semifinals, falling to eventual champions, Brooklyn Field Club. They first played used the Whalers name in 1915. This team finished as league champions in both 1915 and 1917. Other teams in the league included Fall River Rovers. Of the five men who founded the club, John Fernley later became the president of the USFA and is in the National Soccer Hall of Fame. New Bedford was noted as having three full kits, a home, away and third kit.

== New Bedford Whalers II ==
In 1924 a second New Bedford Whalers, formed by former members of Fall River Rovers, joined the American Soccer League. In both 1926 and 1928 they finished as runners-up in the league and quickly developed a rivalry with Fall River F.C. In 1926 the second Whalers won their only major trophy when they defeated New York Giants 5–4 in a two-game series to win the Lewis Cup. 1926 also saw the Whalers play in the one-off 1926 International Soccer League season which featured teams from both the United States and Canada. In 1929 the ASL and the US Football Association became involved in a power struggle, sometimes referred to as the Soccer Wars. This resulted in the emergence of a rival Eastern Soccer League, organized by the USFA. The Whalers began the year in the ASL but subsequently joined the ESL. However, after just 8 games they rejoined the ASL. On their return they finished as ASL runners-up in both the Spring 1930 and Fall 1930 seasons. However the Great Depression severely effected the teams support and they failed to complete the Spring 1931 season. On April 19, 1931 they merged into Fall River F.C.

== New Bedford Whalers III ==
The third Whalers were actually a successor club of Fall River F.C. Like the second Whalers, the 'Marksmen' had also suffered because of the Great Depression and for the Spring 1931 season their owner, Sam Mark, relocated them to New York where they merged with New York Soccer Club, previously known as the New York Giants, and became the New York Yankees. However the relocation to New York was not a financial success and for the Fall 1931 season, Mark relocated his team again. This time they merged with Fall River F.C. and revived the New Bedford Whalers name. The third Whalers were the American Soccer League champions for the Fall 1931 and Spring 1932 seasons and won the 1932 National Challenge Cup but then folded during the Fall 1932 season

== Year-by-year ==
Season	Div.	League			National cup
Season	Div.	Assoc.	Reg. season	Playoffs	National cup
1914–15	N/A	SNESL	Champion	No playoff	Third round
1915–16	N/A	SNESL	?	No playoff	Quarter finals
1916–17	N/A	SNESL	Champion	No playoff	Second round
1917–18	N/A	SNESL	?	No playoff	did not participate
1924–25	1	ASL	5th	No playoff	did not participate
1925–26	1	ASL	2nd	No playoff	Second round
1926	N/A	ISL	3rd	No playoff	Second round
1926–27	1	ASL	4th	No playoff	First round
1927–28	1	ASL	3rd, 1st (Note: Results in first and second half, respectively.)	Runners-up	First round
1928–29	N/A	ASL	5th, 8th	N/A	did not participate
1928–29	1	ESL	6th	No playoff	did not participate
Spring 1930	1	ACL/ASL	2nd	No playoff	Second round
Fall 1930	1	ASL	2nd	?	Second round
Spring 1931	1	ASL	8th	N/A	First round
Fall 1931	1	ASL	2nd	Runners-up	First round
Spring 1932	1	ASL	Champion	No playoff	Champion
Fall 1932	1	ASL	8th	No playoff	Champion

== Former managers ==
- (England) Harold Brittan: 1926

== Honors ==
New Bedford Whalers I

- Southern New England Soccer League
  - Winners 1914–15, 1916–17: 2

New Bedford Whalers II

- American Soccer League
  - Runners Up 1925–26, 1927–28, Spring 1930, Fall 1930: 4
- Lewis Cup
  - Winners 1926: 1
  - Runners Up 1929: 1

New Bedford Whalers III

- American Soccer League
  - Winners 1932 : 1
- National Challenge Cup
  - Winners 1932: 1
