= American Soccer League (1921–1933) =

Former soccer league

- Founded: 1921; 105 years ago
- Folded: 1933; 93 years ago
- Country: United States
- Promotion to: None
- Relegation to: None

The American Soccer League, established on May 7, 1921 by a group of investors, was the first of four different professional soccer sports leagues in the United States to use the ASL name. It was formed by the merger of teams from the National Association Football League and the Southern New England Soccer League. For several years the ASL's popularity rivaled the popularity of the National Football League. Disputes with the United States Football Association and FIFA, as well as the onset of the Great Depression, led to the league's collapse in spring 1933.

== History ==
The original American Soccer League, operating between 1921 and 1933, was the first significant, viable, professional soccer league in the United States. The league operated primarily in the Northeastern United States, mainly in the New York metropolitan area, Massachusetts, Rhode Island, and Pennsylvania. The ASL was created by the merger of several teams from the National Association Football League (NAFBL) and Southern New England Soccer League in 1921. The move came from a growing disenchantment with the mismanagement of the NAFBL as well as the desire by the United States Football Association (USFA) to create a unified first division league. The ASL's first secretary was Thomas Cahill, who had founded the United States Football Association and who had been the first head coach of the U.S. national team.

By 1924, the combination of excellent pay and a high level of play drew talented overseas players, especially from Scotland and England, with 50 European internationals good enough to play for their national teams playing in the ASL. This led to a significant amount of resentment in Europe and threats of sanctions from FIFA, including the possible expulsion of the USFA. At the Sixteenth Annual Congress of FIFA on June 4, 1927, the USFA and the other national associations came to an agreement regarding player transfers which defused the situation. The ASL then ran afoul of the USFA when team owners complained that USFA's requirement that ASL teams play in the National Challenge Cup created an unnecessary financial burden. At the time the Challenge Cup ran during the ASL season forcing the ASL teams to travel long distances by train or bus to play cup games, then return to the Northeast to play league games. Therefore, the ASL boycotted the 1924 National Challenge Cup. They reentered the competition the next year after the USFA reduced its take of the gate receipts from 33.3% to 15%.

=== Soccer wars ===
However, resentment continued to simmer between the league and governing body. Matters came to a head in 1928, when the ASL decided to again boycott the Challenge Cup. When three ASL clubs, most prominently Bethlehem Steel, defied the league and entered the cup anyway, the ASL suspended them. In response, the USFA and FIFA declared the ASL an "outlaw league". This sparked the "soccer war". The ASL team owners defied USFA and FIFA, relying on the league's reputation to continue to draw players. At first it seemed as if the ASL might win; however, USFA then helped bankroll the creation of a new league, the Eastern Professional Soccer League (ESL), to rival the ASL. The three ex-ASL teams joined with several teams from the Southern New York Soccer Association (SNYSA) to form the ESL. This led to the SNYSA, under the leadership of Nat Agar, owner of the ASL Brooklyn Wanderers, to leave USFA and ally with the ASL. Despite the alliance between the ASL and SNYSA, the creation of a competing league caused severe financial strains on the ASL. The league finally broke and came into compliance with USFA and FIFA. In the fall of the 1929/30 season, the ESL and ASL merged to form the Atlantic Coast League which began a 1930 spring-fall season. After the summer break, the league was renamed the American Soccer League and the league finished the fall half of the 1930 season with a different name than it began the spring half.

However, the Soccer Wars had permanently crippled the ASL and it collapsed at the end of the 1933 spring season. Ironically, while USFA and FIFA "won" the wars and established their pre-eminence over the ASL, the spectacle of a U.S. athletic association conspiring with a European organization to undermine a U.S. athletic league alienated many U.S. sports fans by creating an image of soccer as a sport controlled by foreigners. These fans turned their backs on soccer, relegating the sport to the position of a minor league, ethnic-based sport for decades to come.

== Champions ==
Year	Winner (number of titles)	Runners-up	Top scorer
1921–22	Philadelphia F.C. (1)	New York F.C.	Harold Brittan
1922–23	J. & P. Coats F.C. (1)	Bethlehem Steel F.C.	Daniel McNiven
1923–24	Fall River F.C. (1922–1931) (1)	Bethlehem Steel	Archie Stark
1924–25	Fall River F.C. (1922–1931) (2)	Bethlehem Steel	Archie Stark
1925–26	Fall River F.C. (1922–1931) (3)	New Bedford Whalers	Andy Stevens
1926–27	Bethlehem Steel (1)	Boston S.C.	Davey Brown
1927–28	Boston S.C. (1)	New Bedford Whalers	Andy Stevens
1928–29	Fall River F.C. (1922–1931) (4)	Brooklyn Wanderers	Werner Nilsen; János Nehadoma
1929	Fall River F.C. (1922–1931) (5)	Providence F.C.	Bill Paterson
1930	Fall River F.C. (1922–1931) (6)	New Bedford Whalers	Jerry Best
1931	New York Giants (1)	New Bedford Whalers	Bob McIntyre
1932	New Bedford Whalers (1)	Hakoah All-Stars	Bert Patenaude
1932–33	Fall River F.C. (1)	Pawtucket Rangers	

== Complete team list ==
Legend

– existed before joining ASL. – continued after ASL. – existed before ASL and after ASL.

Team	ASL Seasons	ASL Evolution of Franchise	Prior League	Subsequent League
Bethlehem Steel F.C.	1922/23–1928/29, (Note: The club was suspended on September 27, 1929, after 6 games for refusing to abide by the ASL's requirement not to take part in the National Challenge Cup.) 1929/30	Philadelphia F.C.→Bethlehem Steel F.C.	–	–
Bohemian Queens	1932–1933 (Note: The club played the first game of the 1933 season before franchise change.)	Bohemian Queens→Prague Americans	–	–
Boston Soccer Club	1924/25–1929/30	–	–	–
Boston S.C. aka Boston Bears	1931–1932	–	–	–
Bridgeport F.C.	1929/30 (Note: The club moved mid-season after six games.)	Bridgeport F.C.→Philadelphia F.C.	–	–
Bridgeport F.C.	1929/30 (Note: Played first game as Hungaria F.C.. The club moved to Newark mid-season for final five games.)	Hungaria F.C.→Bridgeport F.C.→Newark Americans	ESL	–
Brookhattan F.C.	1933	New York Field Club→Brookhattan F.C.	–	ASL II
Brooklyn Wanderers F.C.	1922/23–1931	–	NJSL	–
Brooklyn Wanderers F.C.	1932–1933	–	–	ASL II
Celtic F.C. aka Jersey City Celtics	1921/22 (Note: Team folded after losing first five games of season.)	–	–	–
Falco F.C. aka Holyoke Falcos	1921/22	– (Note: Abandoned franchise purchased by owner of Paterson F.C.)	???	???
Fall River F.C.	1922/23–1930 (Note: Before the 1931 season, Sam Mark purchased the New York S.C. franchise. He merged the clubs and renamed the merged club the New York Yankees.)	Fall River F.C.→ New York Yankees→New Bedford Whalers	–	–
Fall River United A.A.F.C.	1921/22	–	–	–
Fall River F.C.	1931 (Note: During the break between the first and second half of the 1931 season, the club folded and the New York Yankees obtained the club's assets.)	Providence F.C.→Fall River F.C.→ New York Yankees→New Bedford Whalers	–	–
Fall River F.C. (1932)	1932	–	–	–
Fleisher Yarn F.C.	1924/25	–	???	???
Hakoah All-Stars	1929/30–1932	–	ESL	–
Hakoah F.C. aka Brooklyn Hakoahs	1929/30 (Note: Nat Agar owned both the Brooklyn and Hakoah clubs at the time of the merger. He merged the Brooklyn club into the All-Stars and that club entered the new league.)	Hakoah F.C.→Hakoah All-Stars	–	–
Harrison S.C.	1921/22–1922/23	Harrison S.C.→Newark F.C.	NAFBL	–
Hartford F.C.	1927/28 (Note: Withdrew in late October after 11 games in order to even number of clubs in league due to the forfeiture of Philadelphia F.C.)	–	–	–
Indiana Flooring Co. F.C.	1924/25–1926/27	New York F.C.→Indiana Flooring Co. F.C.→ New York Nationals S.C.→New York Giants	–	–
J. & P. Coats A.A.F.C.	1921/22–1928/29 (Note: The club disbanded & withdrew from ASL on March 23, 1929. Franchise transferred to Pawtucket S.C. on March 26. Pawtucket took over J. & P. Coats season record and schedule.)	J. & P. Coats F.C.→Pawtucket Rangers	SNEL	–
Jersey City F.C.	1928/29 (Note: The club joined for the second half of the season but folded after seven games.)	–	–	–
National Giants F.C.	1923/24	Paterson F.C.→National Giants F.C.→New York Giants S.C.→ New York S.C.→New York Yankees→New Bedford Whalers	–	–
Newark F.C. aka Newark Skeeters	1923/24–1928/29 (Note: The club was suspended on September 27, 1929, after 7 games for refusing to abide by the ASL's requirement not to take part in the National Challenge Cup.)	Harrison S.C.→Newark F.C.	–	ESL
Newark Americans	1929/30 (Note: Began season as Bridgeport F.C. and moved to Newark mid-season for final five games.)–1932	Hungaria F.C.→Bridgeport F.C.→Newark Americans	–	–
New Bedford F.C. aka New Bedford Whalers	1924/25–1928/29, (Note: The club left the league in mid-March and joined the Eastern Soccer League. The club rejoined the ASL soon after the end of the season.) 1929/30–1931 (Note: In April, after 11 games, the club merged with Fall River F.C. and continued under the latter's name.)	New Bedford F.C.→Fall River F.C.→ New York Yankees→New Bedford Whalers	–	–
New Bedford Whalers	1931–1932	Fall River United→Fall River F.C.→ New York Yankees→New Bedford Whalers	–	–
New York Americans	1931, (Note: The club withdrew just before the beginning of the 1932 season. At the beginning of the second half, the club formed the National Soccer League with other New York area clubs. After two games, the new league folded and the club rejoined the ASL a few weeks into the second half.) 1932–1933	–	–	ASL II
New York Field Club	1932	New York Field Club→Brookhattan F.C.	–	–
New York F.C. (Note: Formally called New York S.C. in 1922/23-1923/24.)	1921/22–1923/24	New York F.C.→Indiana Flooring Co. F.C.→ New York Nationals S.C.→New York Giants	NAFBL	–
New York Giants S.C.	1924/25–1928/29, (Note: The club was suspended on September 27, 1929, after 8 games for refusing to abide by the ASL's requirement not to take part in the National Challenge Cup.) 1929/30–1930 (Note: The club renamed itself New York S.C. before the second half.)	Paterson F.C.→National Giants F.C.→New York Giants S.C.→ New York S.C.→New York Yankees→New Bedford Whalers	–	–
New York Giants	1930–1931 (Note: The club withdrew just before the beginning of the 1932 season. At the beginning of the second half, the club formed the National Soccer League with other New York area clubs. Just before that season started, Charles Stoneham sold the club to Dan Bremen of the Indiana Flooring Company. Bremen changed the name of the club back to New York Nationals. After two games, the new league folded.)	New York F.C.→Indiana Flooring Co. F.C.→ New York Nationals S.C.→New York Giants	–	NSL
New York Nationals S.C.	1927/28–1930 (Note: The club renamed itself New York Giants before the second half after the New York Giants became New York S.C.)	New York F.C.→Indiana Flooring Co. F.C.→ New York Nationals S.C.→New York Giants	–	–
New York S.C.	1930 (Note: Before the 1931 season, Sam Mark, owner of Fall River F.C., purchased the franchise. He merged the clubs and renamed the merged club the New York Yankees.)	Paterson F.C.→National Giants F.C.→New York Giants S.C.→ New York S.C.→New York Yankees→New Bedford Whalers	–	–
New York Yankees	1931 (Note: During the break between the first and second half of the 1931 season, the New York Yankees obtained the club's assets of Fall River F.C. The club then moved to New Bedford.)	Fall River United→Fall River F.C.→ New York Yankees→New Bedford Whalers	–	–
Paterson F.C.	1922/23	Paterson F.C.→National Giants F.C.→New York Giants S.C.→ New York S.C.→New York Yankees→New Bedford Whalers	NAFBL	–
Pawtucket F.C. aka Pawtucket Rangers	1928/29 (Note: J. & P. Coats disbanded & withdrew from ASL on March 23, 1929. Franchise transferred to Pawtucket S.C. on March 26. Pawtucket took over J. & P. Coats season record and schedule.)–1932	J. & P. Coats F.C.→Pawtucket Rangers	–	ASL-NE
Philadelphia F.C.	1921/22	Philadelphia F.C.→Bethlehem Steel F.C.	–	–
Philadelphia F.C. (Note: Also called Philadelphia Celtic in 1927/28.)	1922/23–1927/28 (Note: In late September 1927, after three games, the ASL took over management of the club and ordered the owner, Fred Maginnis to find a buyer within a month. On October 18, after seven more games, the ASL revoked the franchise, dissolved the club and made all its players free agents.)	–	–	–
Philadelphia F.C.	1928/29 (Note: After the suspension of Bethlehem, Newark and New York Giants on September 27, 1928, the ASL formed this club to bring the league up to eight teams.)	–	–	–
Philadelphia F.C.	1929/30 (Note: The club moved mid-season after Bridgeport had played six games.)	Bridgeport F.C.→Philadelphia F.C.	–	–
Prague Americans	1933 (Note: The club was successor to Bohemian Queens after the latter played their first game of the season.)	Bohemian Queens→Prague Americans	–	–
Providence F.C.	1924/25–1931	Providence F.C.→Fall River F.C.→ New York Yankees→New Bedford Whalers	–	–
Shawsheen F.C. aka Shawsheen Indians	1925/26 (Note: The club folded the first week of April 1926 after playing 29 games.)	–	NL	–
Springfield F.C.	1926/27 (Note: In late December 1926, the club folded. Sam Fletcher, manager of Providence F.C., bought the franchise, including players, uniforms and all other assets.)	Springfield F.C.→Providence F.C.→Fall River F.C.→ New York Yankees→New Bedford Whalers	–	–
Todd Shipyards F.C.	1921/22	–	–	–
