= James Kelly =

James, Jimmy or Jim Kelly may refer to:

== Arts and entertainment ==
- James E. Kelly (artist) (1855–1933), American sculptor and illustrator
- James F. Kelly, American actor
- James Kelly (artist) (1913–2003), American painter
- James Martin Kelly (born 1954), American actor and writer
- James Patrick Kelly (born 1951), American writer
- Jim Kelly (martial artist) (1946–2013), karate champion and film actor
- Jim Kelly (author) (born 1957), British crime writer and journalist
- Jimmy Kelly (singer) (born 1971), Irish-American singer and musician
- James Kelly, member of Irish metal group Altar of Plagues
- James Kelly (fiddler) (born 1957), Irish fiddler, member of folk group Patrick Street

== Crime and law ==
- James Kelly (pirate) (died 1701), English pirate
- James Kelly (crimper), 19th-century American criminal
- James McGirr Kelly (1928–2005), U.S. federal judge
- James Kelly (Irish Army officer) (1929–2003), cleared of attempting to import arms for the IRA in 1970
- James Kelly (murderer) (1860–1929), English murderer and Jack the Ripper suspect
- Jimmy Kelly (saloon keeper) (fl. 1900–1914), organizer and underworld figure in New York

== Politics ==
=== United States ===
- James Kelly (congressman) (1760–1819), for the Federalist Party, Pennsylvania, 1805–1809
- James K. Kelly (1819–1903), U.S. senator for Oregon (1871–1877)
- James C. Kelly (1857-1947), American politician and farmer from Minnesota
- James W. Kelly Jr. (1908–1990), mayor of East Orange, New Jersey
- James H. Kelly (1919–1984), American politician
- James A. Kelly Jr. (1926–2013), member of Massachusetts House of Representatives and Senate
- James A. Kelly (born 1936), Assistant U.S. Secretary of State for East Asian and Pacific Affairs, 2001–2005
- James B. Kelly III (born 1941), Pennsylvania politician
- James M. Kelly (Boston politician) (1940–2007), Boston City Council member
- James Paul Kelly (1911–1972), American politician, Missouri state senator
- Jim Kelly (Kansas politician) (born 1947), member of the Kansas House of Representatives
- James M. Kelly (Maryland politician) (born 1960), American politician in Maryland

=== Other politics ===
- James Whyte Kelly (1855–1938), New Zealand politician
- James Kelly (Fianna Fáil politician), Irish Fianna Fáil politician
- James Kelly (Repeal Association politician) (1808–1875), Irish Repeal Association politician
- James Kelly (Scottish politician) (born 1963), member of the Scottish Parliament
- James Kelly, MP for the Irish constituency of Limerick City, 1844–1847
- James Francis Kelly, Ontario MPP for Muskoka—Ontario, 1934–1945

== Sports ==
=== Association football ===
- James Kelly (footballer, born 1865) (1865–1932), Scottish football player (Renton FC, Celtic FC, national team) and administrator
- James Kelly (Lincoln City footballer) (fl. 1892–93), Scottish footballer (Lincoln City FC)
- James Kelly (American soccer) (c. 1920s), U.S. soccer player
- Jimmy Kelly (footballer, born 1907) (1907–1984), English professional footballer
- Jimmy Kelly (footballer, born 1911) (1911–1970), Irish international footballer
- Jimmy Kelly (footballer, born 1931) (1931–2003), English footballer active in the 1950s and 1960s
- Jimmy Kelly (footballer, born 1933) (1933–2020), Scottish footballer active in the 1950s
- Jimmy Kelly (footballer, born 1954), Northern Irish footballer active in England and North America in the 1970s and 1980s
- Jimmy Kelly (footballer, born 1957), English footballer for Manchester United and NASL teams
- Jimmy Kelly (footballer, born 1973), English footballer for Wrexham and Wolverhampton Wanderers
- Jimmy Kelly (Northern Ireland footballer) (fl. 1920s), Northern Irish footballer

=== American football ===
- Jim Kelly (born 1960), American football Hall of Fame quarterback
- Jimmy Kelly (American football) (1892–1964), American NFL player
- Jim Kelly (tight end, born 1942) (1942–2022), American football player
- Jim Kelly (tight end, born 1951), American football player

=== Other sports ===
- Jim Kelly (baseball) (1884–1961), American
- Jimmy Kelly (Mooncoin hurler) (1884–1966), Irish hurler
- Jimmy Kelly (Carrickshock hurler) (1916–1985), Irish hurler
- Jim Kelly (coach) (1893–1972), American basketball, football, and track and field coach
- Jim Kelly (Australian cricketer) (1867–1938), wicket-keeper
- Jim Kelly (New Zealand cricketer) (1928–1995), Wellington representative cricketer in 1951
- Jim Kelly (boxer) (1912–?), Northern Irish boxer of the 1920s, '30s and '40s
- Jimmy Kelly (boxer) (born 1992), Irish boxer
- James Kelly (Australian footballer) (born 1983), Australian rules footballer
- Jim Kelly (sportscaster), American sportscaster
- James Kelly (basketball) (born 1993), American basketball player
- Jimmy Kelly (rugby union), Irish international rugby union player

== Other ==
- James Kelly (Australian explorer) (1791–1859), Australian mariner and explorer
- James Kelly (journalist) (1809–1895), founder of Chicago Tribune
- James Kelly (bishop) (1832–1907), Anglican bishop of Newfoundland and Scotland
- James Kelly (priest) (1877–1939), New Zealand Catholic priest and editor
- James W. Kelly (1913–1989), U.S. Navy admiral
- James Kelly (historian) (born 1959), professor of Irish history
- James M. Kelly (astronaut) (born 1964), NASA astronaut on Space Shuttle missions
- James Graves Kelly (1843–1923), officer in the British Indian Army
- James Gordon Kelly (1929–2020), professor of psychology
- James Johnson Kelly (1928–2018), Tuskegee Airman
- James P. Kelly, CEO of United Parcel Service, 1997–2001
- Jim Kelly, managing editor of Time magazine (2001–2005)

== See also ==
- James Kelley (disambiguation)
- James Edward Kelly (disambiguation)
- James Fitzmaurice-Kelly (1858–1923), British writer on Spanish literature
- Jim Kelly Peak, a mountain in British Columbia, Canada
