= Joe Hill Award =

- Type: Labor, lifetime achievement award
- Awarded for: Labor culture
- Description: Named in honor of Joe Hill
- Sponsored by: Labor Heritage Foundation
- Date: June
- Venue: Great Labor Arts Exchange
- Established: June 1979; 47 years ago
- Website: Award page
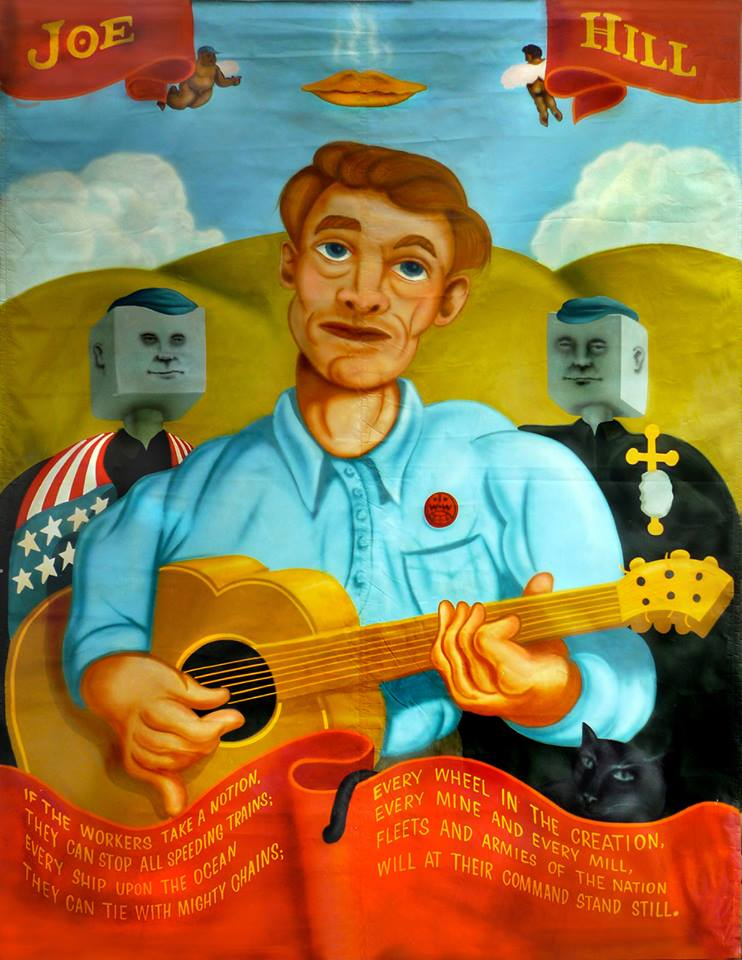
- Joe Hill mural airbrushed by Mike Alewitz during the festival, 1992

The Joe Hill Award is awarded annually at the Great Labor Arts Exchange by the Labor Heritage Foundation.

== Background ==
The award is named for Joe Hill, a radical songwriter, labor activist and member of the Industrial Workers of the World. He was executed for the murder of a Salt Lake City grocer and his son, a crime for which the police released a more likely suspect. Hill's conviction and unsuccessful appeal generated international calls for clemency, including by President Woodrow Wilson. Hill was memorialized in a tribute poem written about 1930 by Alfred Hayes, titled "I Dreamed I Saw Joe Hill Last Night" (often referred to simply as "Joe Hill"). Hayes's lyrics were turned into a song in 1936 by Earl Robinson. Paul Robeson and Pete Seeger often performed this song and are associated with it. Joan Baez's Woodstock performance of "Joe Hill" in 1969 is the most well-known recording.

The Labor Heritage Foundation began presenting the Joe Hill Award in 1989. Given during the foundation's annual arts festival, the Great Labor Arts Exchange. It is a lifetime achievement award in the field of labor culture.

== Recipients ==
- 1989: John Handcox
- 1990: Emmanuel Fried
- 1991: Ralph Fasanella
- 1992: Joyce Kornbluh
- 1993: Cesar Chavez
- 1994: Moe Foner
- 1995: Pete Seeger
- 1996: Anne Romaine
- 1997: Joe Glazer
- 1998: Archie Green
- 1999: Guy Carawan and Candie Carawan
- 2000: Rev. James Orange
- 2001: Baldemar Velasquez
- 2002: Faith Petric
- 2003: Hazel Dickens
- 2004: Utah Phillips
- 2005: Anne Feeney
- 2006: Joe Uehlein
- 2007: Julius Margolin
- 2008: Peter Jones
- 2009: Ricardo Levins Morales
- 2010: Jerry Gray
- 2011: Jon Fromer & Bobbie Rabinowitz
- 2012: Saul Schniderman & Pablo Davis
- 2013: Barbara Bailey & Shelley Kessler
- 2014: Pat Wynne & Charlie King
- 2015: Fruit of Labor Singing Ensemble
- 2016: Luci Murphy & Jimmy Kelly
- 2017: Bev Grant & Janet Stecher
- 2018: John McCutcheon & Lynn Marie Smith
- 2019: Kathleen Farrell & Si Kahn
- 2020: Ysaye Barnwell & Steve Jones
- 2021: Gary Huck & Mike Konopacki
- 2022: Judy Ancel & Earl Dotter
- 2023: Susan Eisenberg & David Elsila
- 2024: Elise Bryant & Al Bradbury
- 2025: Mark Dimondstein & Rosemary Feurer
