= Great Labor Arts Exchange =

- Genre: Labor festival, arts festival
- Frequency: Annually in June
- Venue: George Meany Center (original)
- Location: Silver Springs, Maryland
- Country: United States
- Inaugurated: June 1979; 47 years ago
- Founder: Joe Glazer
- Major events: Joe Hill Award presentation
- Organiser: Labor Heritage Foundation

The Great Labor Arts Exchange is an annual arts festival in Silver Spring, Maryland, which celebrates the labor history of the United States as well as preserves, advances and promotes the culture of the American labor movement.

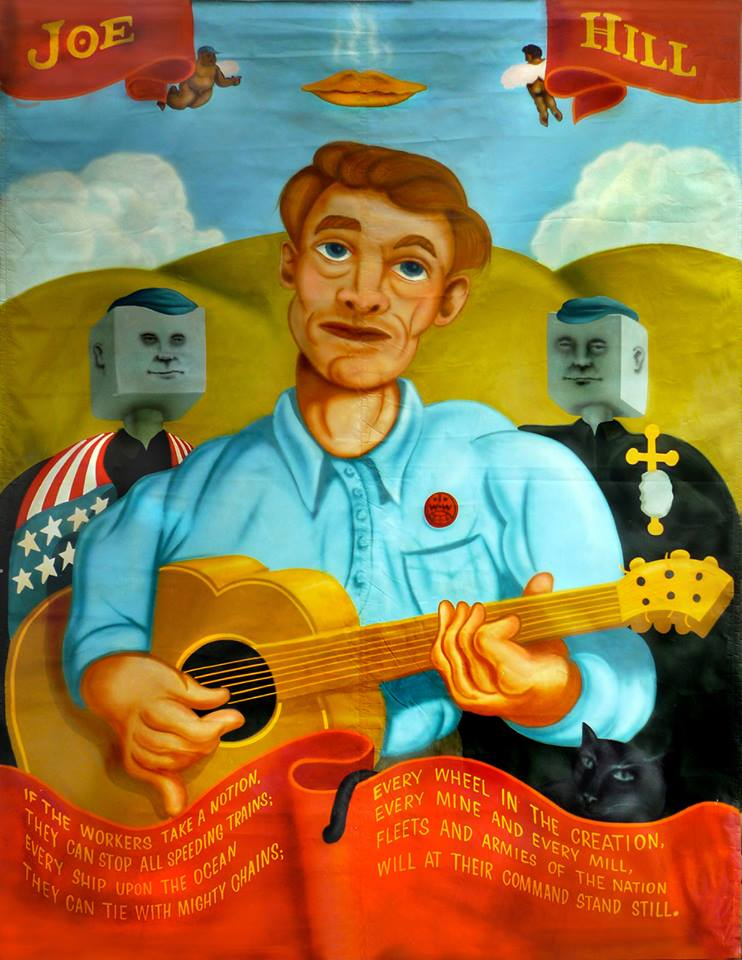
Mural of Joe Hill, airbrushed by Mike Alewitz during event, 1992

In June 1979, Joe Glazer, a composer, musician and educator active in the American labor movement, invited 14 other labor musicians to the George Meany Center for Labor Studies in Silver Spring to share labor-related musical and written compositions, and to discuss the effective use of music, song, poetry and chants in labor activism. The three-day event became an annual one, becoming known as the Great Labor Arts Exchange (GLAE).

Over the next five years, the concept of "labor culture" and how the labor movement and the arts interacted which Glazer and others held expanded. In 1984, Glazer incorporated the Labor Heritage Foundation as a parent body for GLAE as well as to curate and promote the culture of the American labor movement.

GLAE remains the largest and most prominent program of the Labor Heritage Foundation. The festival now includes a variety of artistic and cultural endeavors, such as cartooning, painting, film, puppetry, street theater, and photography. GLAE participants have included singer Pete Seeger, artist Ralph Fasanella, photographer Earl Dotter and poet Chris Llewellyn.

The Labor Heritage Foundation began presenting the Joe Hill Award in 1989. The award, given during GLAE, honors individuals for a body of work in the field of labor culture.
