= Collector Records =

American record label

Collector Records was founded in 1970 by Joe Glazer, an American folk singer. Glazer is known as “labor’s troubador” and he started the label to distribute albums of his own interpretations and compositions of American labor songs. Working with an organization called the Great Labor Arts Exchange, Glazer also released recordings of other performers in the modern U.S. labor movement. The label was donated to the Ralph Rinzler Folklife Archives and Collections in 2005.
