= Labor Heritage Foundation =

Nonprofit US labor history organization

Labor Heritage Foundation>
- Abbreviation: LVH
- Established: 1983; 43 years ago
- Founders: Joe Glazer, Joe Uehlein and Saul Schniderman
- Type: Historical society
- Headquarters: 815 16th Street Northwest; Washington, D.C. 20006
- Coordinates: 38.9009103°N 77.0384974°W
- Origins: Great Labor Arts Exchange
- Region served: United States
- Methods: Radio show, podcast, film festival, & awards
- Field: Labor history
- Executive Director: Chris Garlock
- Accounting Officer: Jennifer Schwartz
- Board of directors: Saul Schniderman (Chair), Ashley See (President), Kimmon Williams (Secretary), & Elise Bryant (Fundraising)
- Award: Joe Hill Award
- Website: laborheritage.org

The Labor Heritage Foundation is a non-profit organization which preserves and disseminates information and artifacts about the labor history of the United States.

== History ==
The genesis of the Labor Heritage Foundation was in June 1979. Joe Glazer, a composer, musician and educator active in the American labor movement. Glazer invited 14 other labor musicians to the George Meany Center for Labor Studies in Silver Spring, Maryland to share musical and written compositions, and to discuss the effective use of music, songs, poetry and chants in labor activism. The three-day event became an annual one, becoming known as the Great Labor Arts Exchange (GLAE).

Over the next five years, the concept of "labor culture" and how the labor movement and the arts interacted, which Glazer and others held, expanded. In 1984, Glazer, with Joe Uehlein and Saul Schniderman, incorporated the Labor Heritage Foundation as a parent body for GLAE, as well as to curate and promote the culture of the American labor movement.

The Labor Heritage Foundation is governed by a board of directors.

In 1986, the foundation hired its first executive director. The executive director, a full-time position, oversees the day-to-day operations of the foundation.

The Labor Heritage Foundation shares office space with the AFL–CIO in Washington, D.C. The Great Labor Arts Exchange continues to be held at the original venue, which became the National Labor College (from 1997 to 2014) and now is the Tommy Douglas Conference Center.

== Programs ==
GLAE remains the largest and most prominent program of the Labor Heritage Foundation. The festival now includes a variety of artistic and cultural endeavors, such as cartooning, painting, film, puppetry, street theater, and photography. GLAE participants have included singer Pete Seeger, artist Ralph Fasanella, photographer Earl Dotter and poet Chris Llewellyn.

Concurrently with GLAE, the Labor Heritage Foundation also holds an annual Conference on Creative Organizing, which trains worker activists and labor union staff in the use of songs, chants, skits, costumes, food, and other cultural media in organizing and collective bargaining campaigns.

Publishing constitutes a third major program of the foundation. The organization has published a number of books and pamphlets. Topics include labor history, song, photography, poetry, children's activities, short story collections, biographies and autobiographies, graphic novels, and collections of graphic art. The foundation has also published a limited number of audio recordings, including song collections and oral histories.

In 1996, the foundation developed the Labor Culture Consulting and Referral Service, a database of artists active in the labor movement, and published the Directory of Cultural Resources for use by local unions in identifying community artists and arts organizations which may be of assistance in union activities.

The foundation supports regional labor arts festivals and community arts exchanges on an irregular and limited basis.

== Lifetime achievement award ==
The Labor Heritage Foundation began presenting the Joe Hill Award in 1989. The award honors individuals for a body of work in the field of labor culture.
