= James Edward Kelly =

James Edward Kelly may refer to:

- James E. Kelly (artist) (1855–1933), American sculptor and illustrator who specialized in depicting the American Civil War
- Jim Kelly (born 1960), American football quarterback for the Buffalo Bills
- Jimmy Kelly (footballer, born 1907) (1907–1984), English professional footballer

== See also ==
- James Kelly (disambiguation)
