= LHF (disambiguation) =

LHF is the Latvian Ice Hockey Federation, the sports governing body in Latvia.

LHF may also refer to:

== Organizations ==
=== Sports ===
- Lebanese Handball Federation, for handball and beach handball in Lebanese Republic
- Lithuanian Handball Federation, for handball and beach handball in the Republic of Lithuania
- Ligue Handisport Francophone, a member of the Belgian Paralympic Committee

=== Other ===
- Labor Heritage Foundation, an American organization

== Other uses ==
- Long hood forward, a type of diesel locomotive
- Leightonfield railway station (station code: LHF), Australia
