= Resurrection Elementary School =

Resurrection Elementary School may refer to:

- Resurrection Elementary School (Pittsburgh), a former elementary and middle school in Pittsburgh, Pennsylvania
- Resurrection Elementary School, a school in the district served by the Brant Haldimand Norfolk Catholic District School Board
