= Resurrection Elementary School (Pittsburgh) =

- Pittsburgh, Pennsylvania; United States

Information
- School type: Parochial
- Religious affiliations: Roman Catholic, Sisters of Charity of Seton Hill
- Established: 1912
- Founder: Fr. James L. Quinn
- Status: Defunct
- Closed: 1996
- School district: Diocese of Pittsburgh
- Superintendent: Robert L. Paserba (1996)
- Principal: Sr. Lynn Rettinger, S.C. (1996)
- Grades: K-8
- Enrolment: 600 (1996)
- Campus type: Urban
- Colours: Green and white
- Team name: Raiders
- Feeder to: Resurrection High School (former)
- Alumni: Archbishop Bernard Hebda, Anne Feeney

Resurrection Elementary School, often simply called Ressi, was a Roman Catholic parochial elementary and middle school associated with Resurrection Parish in Pittsburgh, Pennsylvania. The school opened in 1912 and served grades one to eight until its closure in 1996, when it merged with two other schools to form Brookline Regional Catholic School, now known as St. John Bosco Academy.

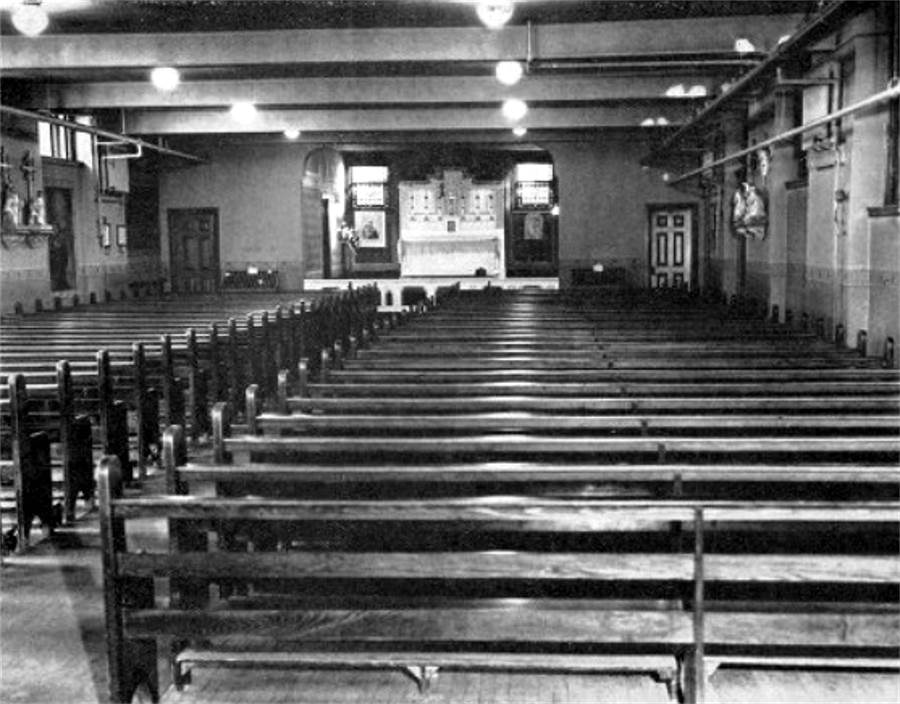
The basement sanctuary where Masses were celebrated until 1939.

== History ==
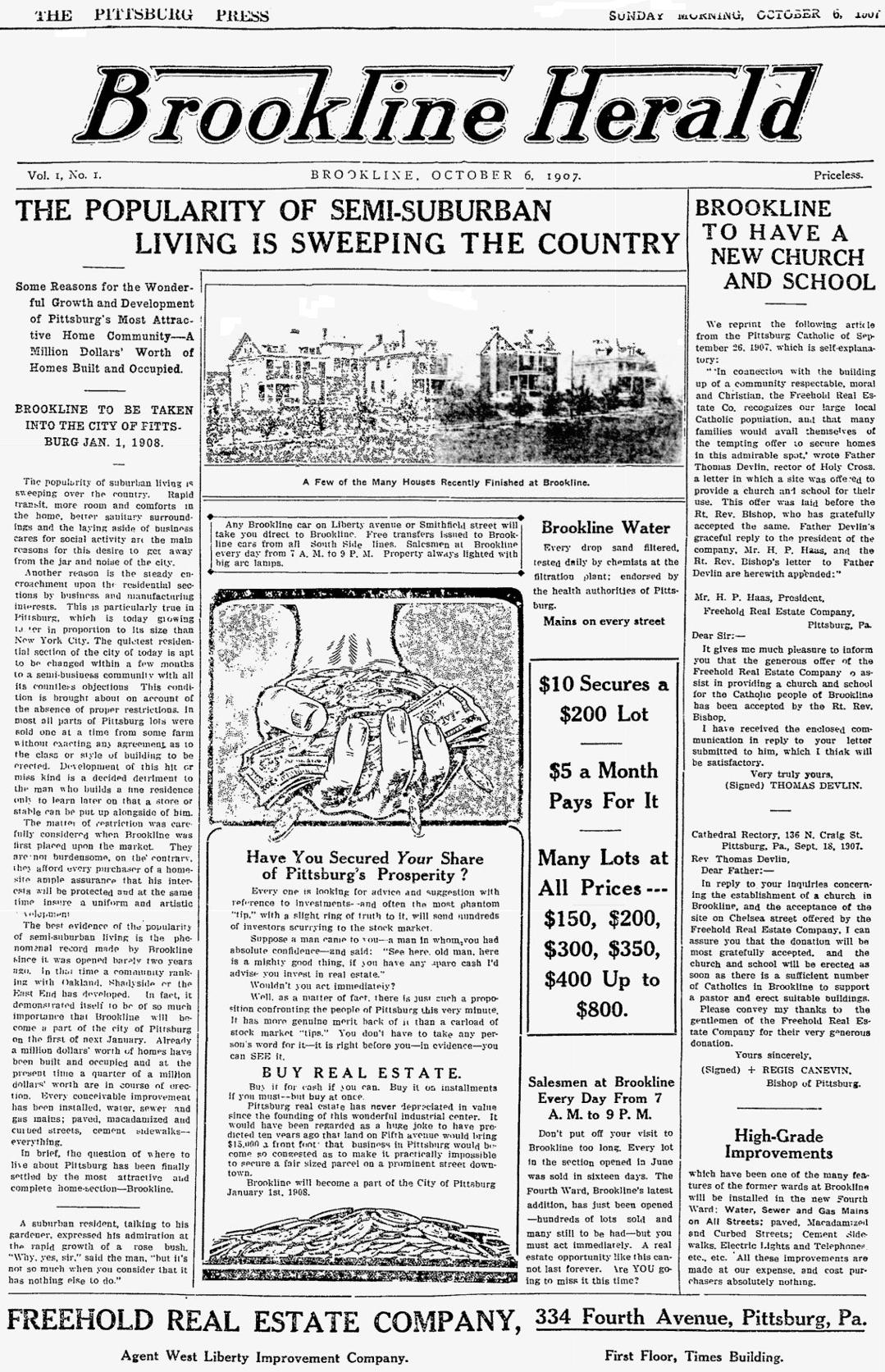
A 1907 Brookline Herald article announcing the creation of what would become the Church of the Resurrection and Resurrection Elementary School.

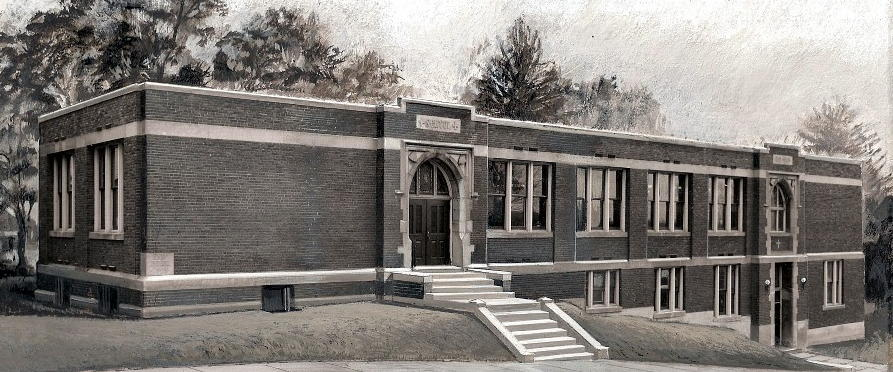
The completed Resurrection parish building, containing classrooms and a basement sanctuary.

Enrollment, 1912–96
Year	Pop.	±%
1912	115	—
1914	250	+117.4%
1918	330	+32.0%
1919	375	+13.6%
1923	400	+6.7%
1924	490	+22.5%
1926	596	+21.6%
1928	800	+34.2%
1929	875	+9.4%
1934	925	+5.7%
1939	875	−5.4%
1944	925	+5.7%
1949	975	+5.4%
1951	1,171	+20.1%
1953	1,300	+11.0%
1954	1,550	+19.2%
1959	1,900	+22.6%
1962	2,000	+5.3%
1996	600	−70.0%

In 1909, less than a year after Resurrection Parish was established, construction of a new building to house a sanctuary began. In 1912, a third-floor addition was added to hold the sanctuary, and the first and second floors were converted to classrooms and a gymnasium to house the new Resurrection Elementary School. The first students entered the school on September 9, 1912, with six Sisters of Charity of Seton Hill as teachers. In the summer of 1912, another addition was added to accommodate the rapidly growing number of students.

In 1928, just 16 years after opening, the school had 800 students and a third addition. From the time of the school's opening, Ressi was the main feeder school of Resurrection High School, also of Resurrection parish, until the high school's closure in 1935. In 1938, a new, separate church building was erected, and the Resurrection Elementary was able to expand into what was formerly church quarters. By 1953, more than 1,300 students attended the school, and additional space was needed. Kindergarten and first grade moved into four classrooms in the converted church basement, and the gym was also divided into classrooms. In 1957, a new middle school annex with six classrooms was built, along with a new convent for the growing number of Sisters. Peak enrollment was in 1962, at about 2,000.

In 1963, the school shrank slightly due to the opening of Our Lady of Loreto School nearby. However, the school still needed space, and in 1965 the Activities Center opened, containing a gymnasium, six new classrooms, library, and rooms for use by the parish.

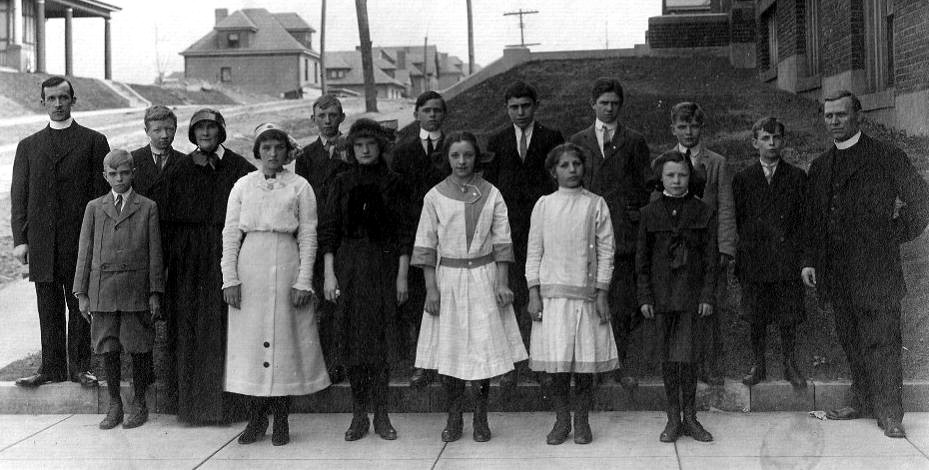
Some of the original 115 students who attended Resurrection Elementary School in 1912, shown standing with some pastors and teachers.

During the 1970s and 80s, the school enrollment continued to drop. By 1996, there were only 600 students left, down 71% from a peak of 2,000 in 1962. In 1996, the school merged with Our Lady of Loreto School and St. Pius X School to create Brookline Regional Catholic School, now known as St. John Bosco Academy.

== List of principals ==
Principal	Year
Sr. Mary Helena Degnan, S.C.	1912-18
Mother Mary Eveline Fisher, S.C.	1918-21
Sr. Rose Vincent McNulty, S.C.	1921-27
Mother Mary Joseph Havey, S.C.	1927-33
Sr. Mary Helena Degnan, S.C.	1933-39
Sr. Mary John Minahan, S.C.	1939-41
Sr. Mary Esperance Walsh, S.C.	1941-43
Sr. Mary Helena Degnan, S.C.	1943-45
Sr. Mary James Cain, S.C.	1945-51
Sr. Mary Ermanilda Knepley, S.C.	1951-57
Sr. Caroline Joseph Wilson, S.C.	1957-63
Sr. Jean Ann Wilburn, S.C.	1963-65
Sr. Harold Ann Jones, S.C.	1965-72
Sr. Mary Joseph McElhinney, S.C.	1972-75
Sr. Anna Marie Miller, S.C.	1975-80
Sr. Claudia Stehle, S.C.	1980-87
Sr. Loretta Topper, S.C.	1987-90
Sr. Lynn Rettinger, S.C.	1990-96

== Notable alumni ==
- Anne Feeney, political activist, musician, and singer-songwriter
- Bernard Hebda, Archbishop of Newark, New Jersey
