= Labor's Heritage =

Labor's Heritage was a journal which published articles regarding the history of the labor movement in the United States.

The journal published articles which are scholarly in quality but written for more of a mass audience. Articles cover labor history, labor education, labor culture, interviews with current and former labor leaders and activists, the contemporary American labor movement, and news and information about the National Labor College. The headquarters of the journal was in Silver Spring, Maryland.

The target audience for the journal was academics, students, workers, and labor movement officials and activists. The editors wanted to achieve historical accuracy, and to produce works that would be useful to specialists and of interest to general readers. Photographs were thought to be important to include to draw in interest of readers, although historic ones could not always be of the highest quality.

Stuart Kaufman was the central founder and an editor. The first issue of Labor's Heritage came out in January 1989.

Labor's Heritage was published quarterly by the George Meany Memorial Archives at the National Labor College until 2004.

== See also ==
- labor union
