= James Kelley =

James or Jim Kelley may refer to:

== People ==
- James Kelley (Pennsylvania state senator) (James Reeves Kelley, born c. 1933), Pennsylvania judge and politician
- James R. Kelley (Pennsylvania state representative) (1839–1871), speaker of the Pennsylvania House of Representatives
- James T. Kelley (actor) (1854–1933), Irish-born American silent film actor
- James T. Kelley (architect) (1855–1929), American architect
- James F. Kelley (1902–1996), American Roman Catholic priest and college president
- Jim Kelley (1949–2010), American sports news columnist
- Jim Kelley, Canadian presenter, co-host of the reality TV series Junk Brothers

== Other uses ==
- James Kelley House (disambiguation), historic sites in the US
- Jim Kelley Amplifiers, a guitar amplifier manufacturer

== See also ==
- Kelley James (born 1983), American singer-songwriter
- James Kelly (disambiguation)
