= James Paul Kelly =

American politician

James Paul Kelly (March 11, 1911 - November 6, 1972) was an American Republican politician from Trenton, Missouri, who served in the Missouri General Assembly. He served in the Missouri Senate between 1955 and 1967. Born in Pleasant Hill, Illinois, he was educated in the public schools of Pleasant Hill, Illinois and later at Kemper Military School in Boonville, Missouri and at the University of Missouri. In 1935, he married Caroline C. Hyde in Trenton, Missouri.

He served three years in the military during World War II with the 8th Air Force and the United States Strategic Bombing Survey and was discharged as a lieutenant colonel. In 1963, he became President of Kemper Military Academy in Missouri.
