= Anne Feeney =

American singer-songwriter and musician (1951–2021)

- Born: July 1, 1951; Charleroi, Pennsylvania, U.S.
- Died: February 3, 2021 (aged 69) Pittsburgh, Pennsylvania, U.S.
- Genres: Traditional music, folk, pop, Irish, bluegrass
- Occupation(s): Musician, singer-songwriter, lawyer, activist
- Instruments: Vocals, guitar
- Years active: 1969–2010

Anne Feeney (July 1, 1951 – February 3, 2021) was an American folk musician, singer-songwriter, political activist and attorney. She began her career in 1969 as a student activist playing a Phil Ochs song at a Vietnam War protest, one of many causes she embraced.

As an undergraduate she cofounded Pittsburgh's first rape crisis center and went on to earn a Juris Doctor degree in 1978, seeking to effect social change through the legal system. She worked as a lawyer for 12 years while also pursuing music and activism, and ultimately decided engaging through music was her calling. Blending Irish music with American folk and bluegrass, as well as her political message, she recorded twelve albums and toured most of the period from 1991 to 2015, attending protest rallies and joining the concerts of groups like Peter, Paul and Mary. The latter also recorded a version of Feeney's anthem for civil disobedience, "Have You Been to Jail for Justice?"

== Early life ==
Feeney was born July 1, 1951, in Charleroi, Pennsylvania, to Annabelle (née Runner) and Edward J. Feeney. Her mother was a homemaker and her father a chemical engineer at Westinghouse Electric Co. She had one sister, Kathleen. The family moved to the nearby Brookline neighborhood of the city of Pittsburgh in 1954. Feeney's grandfather, William Patrick Feeney, was a significant early influence on her, as mineworkers' organizer and violinist who also used his music in the service of political and labor causes.

Feeney graduated from Fontbonne Academy, a Catholic girls' high school in Bethel Park, Pennsylvania, in 1968.

== Higher education and beginnings in music and activism ==
As a high school student, Feeney purchased a Martin D-28 guitar in 1968 and gave her first performance at an anti-Vietnam War protest in 1969, playing a song by Phil Ochs. She played the same guitar for 40 years.

She enrolled in college at the University of Pittsburgh (Pitt) and joined Thinking Students for Peace, a group that protested the Vietnam War and apartheid in South Africa. In 1972, while an undergrad, she was arrested in Miami at the Republican National Convention where she was protesting Richard Nixon's re-nomination for President of the United States. That same year, Feeney attended the annual Conference on Women and the Law. Inspired by the group that founded "Women Organized Against Rape" in Philadelphia, Feeney began a campaign for a rape crisis center in Pittsburgh. This effort became Pittsburgh Action Against Rape (PAAR), which still provides services to rape survivors in the Pittsburgh area as of 2021. Feeney graduated from the University of Pittsburgh in 1974 with a Bachelor of Arts degree.

She enrolled in law school, also at Pitt, and in 1976, she joined a bluegrass band, Cucumber Rapids. The group disbanded in 1977, but Feeney carried on performing locally.

== Legal career ==
Feeney graduated from the University of Pittsburgh School of Law in 1978. She worked for 12 years as a trial attorney, something she said had interested her as way to effect social change, although later she found her music to be a better route for that goal. While a lawyer, Feeney's clients were mainly refugees and domestic violence survivors. She was a member of the Gender Bias Committee of the Allegheny County Bar Association.

From the early 1980s through the 2010s, Feeney served on the board of Pittsburgh's Thomas Merton Center, devoted to advocating for peace and justice causes. She was also chapter president of NOW and served on the organization's state executive board in Pennsylvania.

== Music career ==
In 1989, Feeney's music career became an increasing focus after she won a national song writing contest, the Kerrville New Folk contest. Beginning in 1991, Feeney toured North America and the world to perform and participate in political and labor rallies and events. In 2008, she said in an interview, "I think music is a fantastic way of empowering people and giving them strength and energy. I've spent a good part of my life trying to find and write music that will empower people to resist and stand up for what's right." Feeney's music is frequently featured on the broadcast radio program Democracy Now! and her anthem "Have You Been to Jail for Justice?" is featured in the documentaries This is What Democracy Looks Like, Isn't This a Time: A Tribute to Harold Leventhal and Get Up/Stand Up: The History of Pop and Protest. The song is an ode to civil disobedience, beginning, "Was it Cesar Chavez? Maybe it was Dorothy Day / Some will say Dr. King or Gandhi set them on their way / No matter who your mentors are it's pretty plain to see / That, if you've been to jail for justice, you're in good company."

Feeney served as president of the Pittsburgh Musicians' Union from 1997 to 1998, the first and only woman ever elected to this position, as of 2021. She was a member of the Industrial Workers of the World as well as the American Federation of Musicians. In 2005, she was honored with a lifetime achievement award from the Labor Heritage Foundation. Her business cards described her as "Performer, Producer, Hellraiser."

Her first recording, Look to the Left, was released in 1992. She put out 12 albums in all, including Union Maid, If I Can't Dance, Have you Been to Jail for Justice?, and Dump the Bosses Off Your Back. Fenney's last album was Enchanted Way in 2010.

Feeney and her daughter, Amy Berlin, performed Feeney's song "Ain't I a Woman" at the March for Women's Lives in Washington, D.C., on April 25, 2004. Feeney's song "Have You Been to Jail for Justice?" was recorded by Peter, Paul and Mary and she also worked with John Prine and Pete Seeger. Political cartoonist Mike Konopacki included her recording of "Union Maid" in a flash animation in 2003. She also collaborated with spoken word artist Chris Chandler, whom Sing Out! said "finally met his match with the powerful, radical singer-songwriter" Feeney, and called their performances together "highly entertaining."

The Washington Post described her music as "blend[ing] elements of Irish, bluegrass, folk and pop music while coupling many of her melodies with political lyrics, sometimes tinged with satire and humor, that were reminiscent of the '60s protest songs." In 1989, Peter Yarrow of Peter, Paul and Mary wrote expressing his enthusiasm for her music, which he saw as a continuation of his own efforts: "I think your songs are wonderful, your group is terrific and your music rings with resonance of all that Peter, Paul and Mary has attempted to share throughout the last 28 years. It is comforting and exciting to know that the torch of folk music is being passed on to people as concerned, artful and decent as yourselves."

== Personal life and death ==
On November 19, 1977, Feeney married labor attorney Ron Berlin. She and Berlin had two children, Dan and Amy. The marriage ended in divorce in 1995. In 2002, she married Swedish political artist Julie Leonardsson.

In August 2010, while touring in Sweden, Feeney was diagnosed with small cell lung cancer. She underwent treatment, recovered and returned to touring, but the cancer returned in 2015.

Feeney was in rehabilitation for a fracture in her back when she contracted COVID-19 related pneumonia. She died with her family by her side at UPMC Shadyside hospital in Pittsburgh, on February 3, 2021, at age 69.

== Discography ==
=== Solo albums ===
- Grafton Street, 1987
- If I Can't Dance It's Not My Revolution, 1987
- United We Bargain, Divided We Beg!, 1990
- There's a Whole Lot More of Us Than They Think, 1990
- Look to the Left, 1992
- Heartland (Live), 1994
- Have You Been to Jail for Justice?, 2001
- Union Maid, 2003 (Anthology)
- If I Can't Dance, 2006
- Dump the Bosses Off Your Back, 2008
- Enchanted Way, 2010

=== With Chris Chandler ===
- Flying Poetry Circus, 2001
- Live from the Wholly Stolen Empire, 2003

=== Other appearances ===
- The Great Peace March – Songs From The Road (1986) – As part of the ensemble, also producer
- Vote in November: Election 2004 Anti-Theft Device (Various Artists) 2004 – includes "Carnivals #3" (with Chris Chandler)
- Hail To The Thief & His Daddy's Judges: Songs for the Bush Years (Various Artists) 2001 – includes "Carnivals" (with Chris Chandler), "Beady Eyes" (with George Mann), "Corporate Welfare Song"
- Hold Me Up to the Light: A Tribute To Peter Wilde (Various Artists) 2003 – includes "Sourmouth Sprout" (with Chris Chandler)
- Stoking the Fires of Resistance: A Musical History Of The US War On The Iraqi People (Various Artists) – includes "Shell Game"
- Hail to the Thieves Volume III: Songs to Take Our Country Back! (George Mann, Julius Margolin and Friends) 2006 – includes "Defenders of Marriage"
- Classic Labor Songs From Smithsonian Folkways (Various Artists), 2006 – includes "We Just Come To Work Here, We Don't Come To Die"
- Farewell to the Thief! Vol. IV (George Mann, Julius Margolin and Friends) 2008 – includes "Dump the Bosses Off Your Back", "Hallelujah, I'm a Bum"
- Never Surrender (Evan Greer) 2009 – Featured on "The Picketline Song"
- Hugs For Chelsea: Benefit For Chelsea Manning (Various Artists) 2017 – includes "Whatever You Say, Say Nothing"
