= Jimmy Kelly (rugby union) =

Irish rugby union player (born 1940)

- Full name: James Charles Kelly
- Born: 8 April 1940 (age 86) Dublin, Ireland
- University: University College Dublin

Rugby union career
- Position: Scrum-half
International career
Years	Team	Apps	(Points)
1962–64	Ireland	11	(0)

James Charles Kelly (born 8 April 1940) is an Irish former international rugby union player.

Born in Dublin, Kelly was a University College Dublin scrum-half, capped 11 times for Ireland between 1962 and 1964, before being succeeded by Roger Young. He captained Leinster and also once led Ireland, given the captaincy for their match against the 1963–64 All Blacks, which they lost by one-point.

Kelly, a veterinary surgeon, retired from rugby in 1968.

== See also ==
- List of Ireland national rugby union players
