= James Kelly (American soccer) =

American soccer player

Personal information
- Full name: James Kelly
- Position: Wing half

Senior career*
Years	Team	Apps	(Gls)
1923–1925	Newark Skeeters	54	(0)
1926	Philadelphia Field Club	8	(0)
1926–1928	Brooklyn Wanderers	14	(0)
1928–1929	Boston Soccer Club	1	(0)
1929	Bridgeport Hungaria	2	(0)

International career
1925	United States	1	(0)
- * Club domestic league appearances and goals

James Kelly was an American soccer wing half who played in the American Soccer League and earned one cap with the U.S. national team.

== Professional ==
Kelly joined the Newark Skeeters of the American Soccer League in 1923. His best year with the team was the 1924–1925 season when he played thirty-nine league and one league cup games. In 1925, he began the season with Newark, but finished the season with Philadelphia Field Club. In 1926, he joined the Brooklyn Wanderers, but saw time in only fourteen league games in two seasons. He played one game with the Boston Soccer Club during the 1928–1929 season and two with Bridgeport Hungaria in the fall of 1929.

== National team ==
Kelly earned one cap with the U.S. national team in a 6–1 win over Canada on November 8, 1925.
