= James Gordon Kelly =

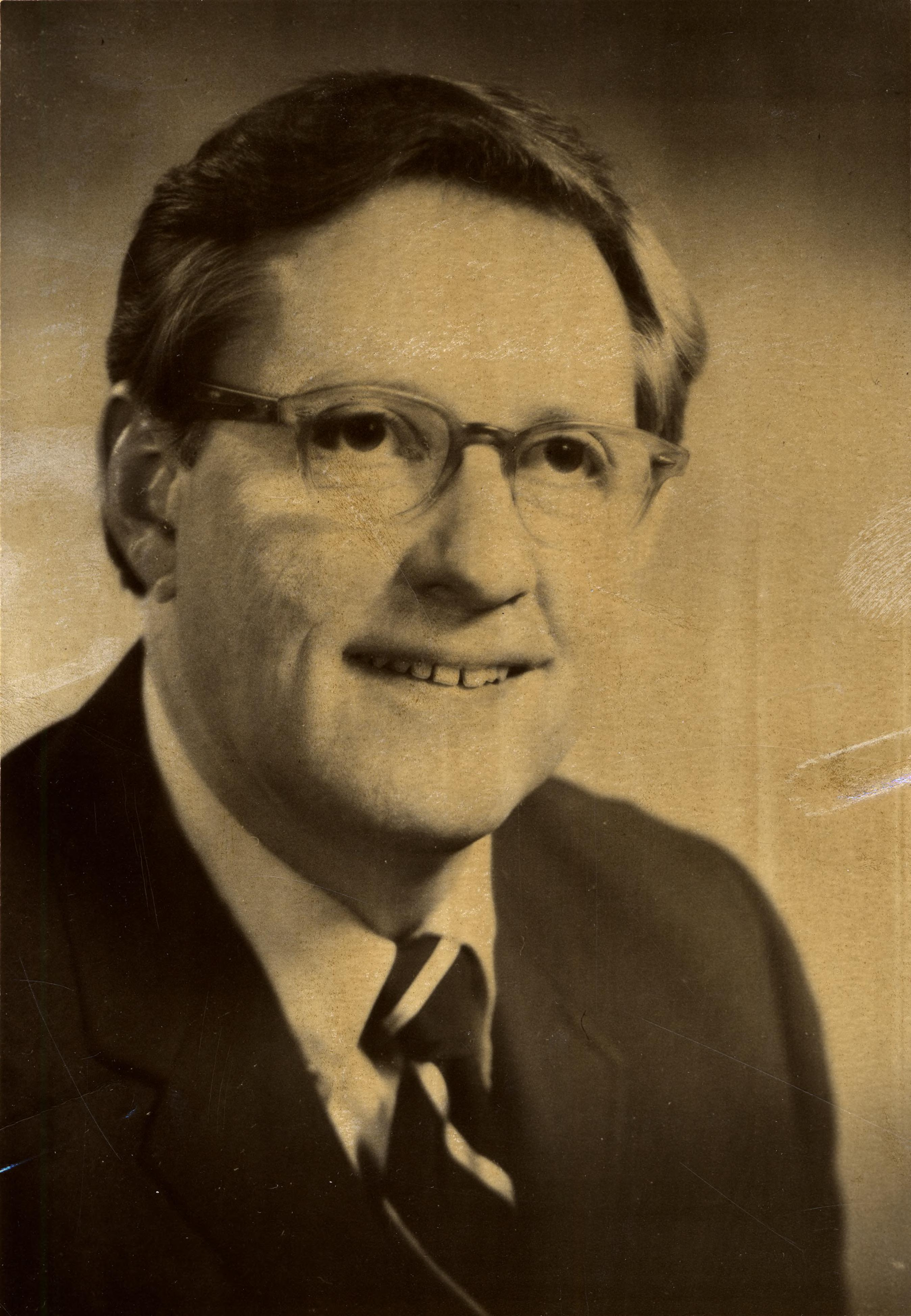
James G. Kelly, Ph.D.

James Gordon Kelly (December 21, 1929 - May 16, 2020) was most recently an Emeritus Professor of Psychology at the University of Illinois at Chicago (UIC) where he retired from in 1999. Following work at the Mental Health Study Center of the National Institute of Mental Health (NIMH), Kelly held tenured positions at Ohio State University, the University of Michigan, the University of Oregon (where he was Dean of the Wallace School of Community Service and Public Affairs), and UIC.

Jim Kelly was a participant in the 1965 Swampscott Conference, an NIMH-sponsored event that was the origin of Community Psychology in the U.S. Throughout his long and exemplary career, Kelly became internationally known for his ecological perspective in Community Psychology. He understood that this new field would need new ways of thinking and acting, so read and integrated ideas from biological ecology to develop his seminal contribution of the ecological metaphor. His ecological thinking placed heavy emphasis on the importance of settings as resources for the health of communities. This approach has been employed across disciplines to design health and mental health research and the development of prevention programs in local communities. His focus was on understanding the interdependent connections between the individual and the community. A symposium on Jim Kelly's contributions to Community Psychology and to scholars in the field was presented during the eighth biennial meeting of the Society for Community Research and Action in Atlanta in 2001. Jason et al. (2016) noted Kelly's Ecological Theory to be a central theory in the field of Community Psychology. He received the 1978 Distinguished Contribution Award and the 2001 Seymour Sarason Award from the Society for Community Research and Action (Division 27 of the American Psychological Association). He also received the Distinguished Contribution to the Public Interest from the American Psychological Association in 1997.

== Early life ==
Kelly was born in Cincinnati, Ohio the only child of James Gordon Kelly and Cosmo Belle Gray. The elder Kelly was a foreman in the shipping department of Procter and Gamble. The younger Kelly attended West Oakley Elementary School and Walnut Hills High School (WHHS) in Cincinnati where he graduated in 1948. In high school, he developed his interest in jazz and baseball and was a radio announcer, actor, and sportswriter. He aspired to be a baseball announcer. He worked in a delicatessen after school and on weekends for cash to attend jazz events and games of the Cincinnati Reds. In December of his sophomore year (1945) his father died suddenly of a heart attack. High school faculty, friends, his grandmother, and parents of friends became important sources of support and advice. During the summer before entering college, he read: Listening with the Third Ear by Theodor Reik which was influential in his later work with community-organizations and developing his ecological model.

== Education ==
Jim Kelly first attended Miami University of Ohio, but transferred to the University of Cincinnati to save on tuition costs. He graduated from the University of Cincinnati with Honors in Psychology in 1953. He received a master's degree from Bowling Green University and a doctorate in Clinical Psychology from the University of Texas at Austin. During his Doctoral Training, he published with Robert Blake and Wayne Holtzman. He completed his doctoral dissertation in 1958 with Louis J. Moran testing the construct validity of concepts within George A. Kelly's Personal Construct Theory.

Kelly then studied with Erich Lindemann, a Harvard community psychiatrist, who left a lasting impression on him. He helped write the Community Mental Health and Social Psychiatry: A Reference Guide published for this new field of Community Mental Health by Harvard University Press in 1962. He then studied with Gerald Caplan at the Harvard School of Public Health on mental health consultation methods that were becoming an example of additional mental health resources available to public health nurses, classroom teachers, and community leaders. He received a Master's in public health from Harvard while also working with Gerald Caplan and Donald Klein. To fulfill his requirement for his military draft deferment he joined the U.S. Public Health Service in 1960 where he was assigned to the Mental Health Study Center, a Field Station of the National Institute of Mental Health (NIMH) in Prince George's County.

== Academic career ==
Jim Kelly joined the Department of Psychology at Ohio State University (OSU) as an associate professor in 1964. He was drawn to OSU because George Kelly was there and Jim Kelly had done some early work on applying George Kelly's ideas. Jim Kelly's first research study at OSU explored the way students interact with each other and the faculty in high schools that varied in population exchange. Kelly identified different coping styles for students and faculty at each school. This experience encouraged him to test out his ideas that population exchange had affected student mental health.

Kelly was recruited to the faculty of the University of Michigan in 1966. He was awarded a 6-year grant from the NIMH to study how junior high school boys with different needs to explore the school environment adapted to two schools with high and low turnover rates. The study supported his notion that person-environment fit was an important consideration for the boys’ coping success as they transitioned to high school. The study also resulted in a book that included seven reports of doctoral students who worked on the project and commentaries by the high school administration in each school. This became a seminal work for those interested in how person-environments interact to support or hinder active coping.

Kelly became Dean of the Lila Acheson Wallace School of Community Service and Public Affairs at the University of Oregon in 1972. He was Dean until 1981 when he left for his last full-time academic position in the Department of Psychology at the University of Illinois at Chicago (UIC). Soon after arriving in Chicago, he published a book on the research process with Ricardo Munoz and Lonnie Snowden. This book included interviews with prominent community psychology researchers to learn about the process of how they conducted their research, rather than the specific outcomes. He continued his commitment to book-length writing with doctoral students at UIC and other colleagues that included lessons learned in the process of community intervention and consultation and research methods in community settings.

At the University of Illinois at Chicago Kelly received an invitation by the Illinois Department of Health to conduct an action research project with the Developing Communities Project (DCP) in the Roseland area of South Chicago. In keeping with his philosophy of community participation and shared ownership in his research projects, Kelly requested that the Director and the executive committee help develop a Planning Committee that would be evaluated by an outside organization. The project lasted over ten years as he applied his ideas of creating an eco-identity, developing trust with community partners, and identifying local competencies that filled different niches in the successful development of DCP. The Planning Committee developed the metaphor that each member of DCP had a tree of personal interests and skills. These competencies formed the structure and branches of the tree. The idea was to help create an organizational structure and process that would enable each citizen to collaborate in a manner that was compatible with their own preferences and talents. This work resulted in several seminal works about community leadership and action research that have been guiding community-based researchers since they were published. They represent his last large project and a culmination of topics and research questions that developed from his goals expressed at the earliest stages of his career.

=== Research ===
Kelly's most important contributions to the field of psychology are the applications of ecological theory from biology to Community Psychology and other sub-disciplines within psychology focused on the development, implementation, and evaluation of prevention interventions. The initial publication of ecological concepts by Kelly was the book: Research Contributions from Psychology to Community Mental Health. This contribution was based on two papers he presented at the 1967 meeting of the American Psychological Association “The Ecology of Adaptation” and “Towards a Theory of Preventive Interventions”. He spent the subsequent 50-plus years demonstrating how to think and act ecologically in collaborating with diverse community groups and organizations on issues defined by the local residents. A compilation of his writings on ecological thinking, Becoming Ecological: An Expedition Into Community Psychology, is a classic text for community psychologists.

Kelly's ecological model focused on four key constructs from biological ecology that he applied to human systems and designing community-based intervention: 1) Interdependence; 2) Adaptation; 3) Resource Cycling: and 4) Succession. Interdependence is the idea that a program is connected to other aspects of the context in which it operates including behaviors other than the ones that are the focus of the intervention, other programs that may exist in the organization or community in which the intervention is located, and the cultural context in which the program operates. Adaptation applies to the idea that all interventions need to be able to adapt to changing environmental circumstances so they need to be organized in a flexible and modifiable fashion from the start. Resource Cycling focuses attention on the resources that must be obtained and managed over time including space, staff skills, financial, and other assets critical for organizational success. Succession is the idea that history of any context needs to be considered for any new program development and that these considerations need to be integrated into planning for sustainability. This framework of applying ecological concepts to community-based work was a constant theme in his action research. He also applied these concepts in the teaching of his graduate course on Social Adaptation which focused on program development and implementation.

His role in the development of the ecological metaphor for understanding and changing human communities shifted thought in Psychology and related fields such as education and public health. His ecological ideas have become fundamental aspects of Community Psychologists’ work worldwide. His ecological thinking also informed his work on the process of change and the development of academic-community partnerships which are guiding principles in Community Psychology. These include the development of trust by honoring local context and cultural humility and giving away the by-line so that the researcher is not the focus of the collaboration. He wrote about these ideas in some of his earliest works which he compiled into the book Becoming Ecological: An Expedition Into Community Psychology at the urging of colleagues and students.

Kelly's ecological ideas expanded to include a focus on structures and processes which he describes in his chapter for the Handbook of Community Psychology. He and his colleagues present four concepts for defining structure and four concepts for defining processes within social systems that are part of an ecological approach. The four concepts for the structure are personal resource potential, social system resources, social settings, and system boundaries. The four concepts for ecological processes include: reciprocity, networking, boundary spanning, and adaptation, This chapter closes with a discussion of how values, norms, and roles may help or hinder the development of these 8 characteristics of structure and process. The chapter is a classic reading for understanding ecological applications for developing preventive interventions in community settings.

=== Notable publications ===
- Kelly, J. G. (1971). Qualities for the community psychologist. American Psychologist, 26(10), 897–903. doi:10.1037/h0032231
- Todd DM, Trickett EJ, Kelly JG. The 1978 Division 27 award for distinguished contributions to community psychology and community mental health: James G. Kelly. Am J Community Psychol. 1979;7(3):239-261. doi:10.1007/BF00890690
- Kelly, James G. (2002). 2001 Seymour B. Sarason Award Address: The Spirit of Community Psychology. American Journal of Community Psychology. 30 (1): 43–63. doi:10.1023/A:1014368000641 PMID 11928776 S2CID 140994400
- Kelly JG, Ferson JE, Holtzman WH. The measurement of attitudes toward the Negro in the South. J Soc Psychol. 1958;48:305-317. doi:10.1080/00224545.1958.9919295
- Kelly JG. Naturalistic Observation in Contrasting Social Environments. In: Naturalistic Viewpoints in Psychological Research. Rinehart and Winston, Inc; 1969:183-199.
- Edwards DW, Kelly JG. Coping and adaptation: A longitudinal study. Am J Community Psychol. 1980;8(2):203-215. doi:10.1007/BF00912660
- Munoz RF, Snowden LR, Kelly JG, eds. Social and Psychological Research in Community Settings: Designing and Conducting Programs for Social and Personal Well-Being. 1st edition. Jossey-Bass Inc Pub; 1979. ASIN 0875894232 ISBN 0875894232
- Kelly JG, Hess RE, Hess R. The Ecology of Prevention: Illustrating Mental Health Consultation. Psychology Press; 1987.
- Kelly JG. A Guide to Conducting Prevention Research in the Community: First Steps. 1 edition. Routledge; 2014. ISBN 9780866568586
- Glidewell JC, Kelly JG, Bagby M, Dickerson A. Natural development of community leadership. In: Theory and Research on Small Groups. Social psychological applications to social issues, Vol. 4. Plenum Press; 1998:61-86.
- Kelly JG. Contexts and community leadership: Inquiry as an ecological expedition. American Psychologist. 1999;54(11):953-961. doi:10.1037/h0088205
- Tandon SD, Azelton LS, Kelly JG, Strickland DA. Constructing a Tree for Community Leaders: Contexts and Processes in Collaborative Inquiry. Am J Community Psychol. 1998;26(4):669-696. doi:10.1023/A:1022149123739
- James GK. Towards an ecological conception of preventive interventions. In: Toward an Ecological Conception of Preventive Interventions. Oxford University Press; 1968:75-99. Accessed August 5, 2020. doi:10.1093/acprof:oso/9780195173796.003.0002
- Kelly JG. Becoming Ecological: An Expedition Into Community Psychology. Oxford University Press Accessed August 4, 2020. doi:10.1093/acprof:oso/9780195173796.001.0001
- Kelly JG, Song AV. Six Community Psychologists Tell Their Stories: History, Concepts, & Narrative. The Hawthorn Press; 2004.
- Kelly JG, ed. Adolescent Boys in High School: A Psychological Study of Coping and Adaptation. 1 edition. Routledge; 2019. ISBN 978-1-138-29444-8
- Kelly JG, Azelton LS, Lardon C, Mock LO, Tandon SD, Thomas M. On Community Leadership: Stories About Collaboration in Action Research. Am J Community Psychol. 2004;33(3):205-216. doi:10.1023/B:AJCP.0000027006.48815.5a
- Kelly, JG.; Mock, LO.; Tandon, DS. Collaborative inquiry with African-American community leaders: Comments on a participatory action research process. In: Reason, P.; Bradbury, H., editors. Handbook of action research. London: Sage; 2001. p. 348-55
- Kelly JG, Ryan AM, Altman BE, Stelzner SP. Understanding and changing social systems: An ecological view. In: Handbook of Community Psychology. Kluwer Academic Publishers; 2000:133-159. doi:10.1007/978-1-4615-4193-6_7
- Kelly, James G. (1989). A Guide to Conducting Prevention Research in the Community: First Steps (1 ed.). Routledge. ISBN 978-0-86656-858-6
- Glidewell, John C.; Kelly, James G.; Bagby, Margaret; Dickerson, Anna (1998). "Natural development of community leadership". Theory and research on small groups. Social psychological applications to social issues, Vol. 4. New York, NY, US: Plenum Press. pp. 61–86. ISBN 978-0-306-45679-4
- Kelly, J. G. (1966). Ecological constraints on mental health services. American Psychologist, 21(6), 535–539. doi:10.1037/h0023598
