= James Kelly (priest) =

New Zealand Catholic priest and editor

James Joseph Kelly (11 November 1877 – 1 February 1939) was a New Zealand Catholic priest and editor. He was born in New Ross, County Wexford, Ireland on 11 November 1877. He was educated at St Peter's College, Wexford and the Irish College, in Rome. He held strong Irish Nationalist sympathies and supported Irish Independence, in New Zealand he strongly supported workers and rights for the poor.

He caused outrage when he called the late Queen Victoria "a certain fat old German woman", and the Solicitor-General, John Salmond, urged the government to have Kelly arrested, but no action was taken.
