= Joe Glazer =

American folk musician

Background information
- Born: June 19, 1918; New York City, U.S.
- Died: September 19, 2006 (aged 88) Chevy Chase, Maryland, U.S.
- Genres: Folk music; protest music
- Spouse: Mildred Krauss (m. 1942)

Joseph Glazer (June 19, 1918 – September 19, 2006) was an American folk musician who recorded more than thirty albums over the course of his career. He was closely associated with labor unions and often referred to as "labor's troubadour".

== Early life and union career ==
Glazer was born in Manhattan, New York City, in 1918, and grew up in the Bronx. He was a graduate of Brooklyn College and was a civilian radio instructor for the United States Army Air Forces during World War II. He eventually moved to Akron, Ohio, where he performed for the United Rubber Workers throughout his career and also served as education director from 1950 to 1962. Glazer was also a member of the Textile Workers Union of America as well as an adviser to the United States Information Agency. According to his obituary in The Washington Post in 2006: "Mr. Glazer in 1961 joined the Foreign Service staff of the U.S. Information Agency, then headed by Edward R. Murrow, and was sent to Mexico as labor information officer. He transferred to the State Department in Washington as a labor adviser in 1965." His younger brother was sociologist Nathan Glazer.

== Singer and songwriter ==
Some of his more acclaimed songs include "The Mill Was Made of Marble," "Too Old To Work" and "Automaton." He recorded "In Old Moscow" ("My Darling Party Line"), a song which ridiculed the Communist Party USA's Stalinist reversal following the 1939 Molotov–Ribbentrop Pact. In 1954 Glazer released two albums of music from the Industrial Workers of the World, including one entirely of songs by Wobbly songwriter Joe Hill, released by Folkways Records.

In 1960 Glazer collaborated with Edith Fowke to publish Songs of Work and Freedom, which included 10 of his original compositions. He went on to dedicate numerous albums to specific trades, including coal mining, newspaper printing, steelwork, textile mills, and woodworking.

In 1970 Glazer founded Collector Records, originally to issue his own recordings, and, later, recordings by other performers. Collector's first release was Glazer's 1971 album Garbage and Other Songs of Our Times backed by jazz guitarist Charlie Byrd and his trio. The title track became one of Glazer's most well-known songs after Pete Seeger performed it on Sesame Street and recorded versions of it both for the children's music and environmentalism markets.

In 1979, Glazer invited 14 other labor musicians to the George Meany Center for Labor Studies in Silver Spring, Maryland, to share musical and written compositions, and to discuss the effective use of music, song, poetry and chants in labor activism. The three-day event became an annual one, becoming known as the Great Labor Arts Exchange (GLAE). Over the next five years, the concept of "labor culture" and how the labor movement and the arts interacted, which Glazer and others promoted, expanded. In 1984, Glazer incorporated the Labor Heritage Foundation as a parent body for GLAE as well as to curate and promote the culture of the American labor movement.

In 2002, Glazer released his autobiography, Labor's Troubadour, published by the University of Illinois Press. Glazer was awarded the Lifetime Achievement Award by the World Folk Music Association in 2002.

His label, Collector Records, later became part of Ralph Rinzler Folklife Archives and Collections distributed by the Smithsonian Folkways label.

== Personal life and death ==
Glazer married Mildred Krauss in 1942, and they had three children. He died from non-Hodgkin lymphoma at his home in Chevy Chase, Maryland, on September 19, 2006, at the age of 88.

== Discography ==
=== 1950s ===
- Eight New Songs for Labor. CIO Department of Education and Research, 1950.
- Ballads for Sectarians. Labor Arts, 1952. Reissued 1953. Also included in Songs for Political Action, Bear Family BCD 15720 JL, 10 CDs, 1996.
- The Songs of Joe Hill. Folkways Records FA 2039, 1954.
- Songs of the Wobblies. Labor Arts, 1954, reissued on LP 1977 and cassette in 1988 by Collector Records.
- Joe Glazer and the PAC Bucks. CIO Education and Research Department, 1955.
- Image of History: Twenty Years of the CIO. UAW Education Department, 1956.
- A Douglas for Me and Other Songs of the New Democratic Party of Canada. Woodworth Book Club of Canada, 1956.
- Ballads for Ballots. Sound Studios, 1956, reissued by Labor's Committee for Kennedy and Johnson, 1960.
- Union Songs. UAW Education Department, 1958.

=== 1960s ===
- Songs of Work and Freedom. Washington Records WR-4601, 1960.
- Democratic Music. Democratic Committee for John F. Kennedy for President, 1960.
- Songs of Coal. Sound Studios, 1964.
- The Golden Presses – That Heavenly Newspaper Plant. The American Newspaper Guild, 1966.
- My Darling Party Line. Sound Studios, 1968. Reissued as cassette, 1988.
- AFSCME Sings with Joe Glazer, 1968. Reissued in 1971 as Joe Glazer Sings Labor Songs, Collector Records #1918.
- Singing about Our Union. AFSCME, 1969.

=== 1970s ===
- Joe Glazer Sings Garbage – and Other Songs of Our Times with the Charlie Byrd Trio. Collector Records #1919, 1971. Reissued in 1980 with 2 extra tracks, and in 1993 as a cassette.
- Joe Glazer Live at Vail. Central Pension Fund of the OEIU, 1973.
- Songs of Steel and Struggle – the Story of the Steelworkers of America. Collector Records, 1975.
- Down in a Coal Mine. Collector Records #1923, 1974. Reissued in 1997 as a cassette.
- Textile Voices – Songs and Stories of the Mills. Collector Records #1922, 1975. Reissued 1985 as a cassette.
- Singing BRAC with Joe Glazer. Collector Records #1924, 1975.
- Union Train. Collector Records #1925, 1975.
- Songs for Woodworkers. Collector Records #1929, 1997.

=== 1980s ===
- Service Employees International Sings with Joe Glazer. SEIU, 1980.
- Joe Glazer Sings Labor Songs. Collector Records, 1980. Reissued 1988 as a cassette; reissued 1994 as a CD.
- A Century of Labor Songs. Collector Records #1934, 1981.
- Jellybean Blues—Songs of Reaganomics. Collector Records #1935, 1982. Also issued 1982 as a cassette.
- Jellybean Blues, Vol. II. Collector Records #1935, 1984. Also issued 1984 as a cassette.
- Songs for USIA. Collector Records, 1985, cassette.
- Fifty Years of the UAW. Collector Records #1934. 1985, cassette.
- Bricklayin' Union Man. Collector Records #1991, 1987, cassette.
- Old Folks Ain't All the Same. Collector Records # 1942, 1987. Also issued 1987 as a cassette.
- Joe Glazer Sings Labor Songs, II. Collector Records #1944, 1989, cassette, reissued on CD in 2001
- The Jewish Immigrant Experience in America. Collector Records #1945, 1989, cassette.

=== 1990s ===
- Sing and Build – Songs for Architects, Builders and Planners. Collector Records #1950, 1991, cassette.
- Welcome to America – Songs of the American Immigrants. Collector Records #1952, 1990, cassette.
- Folk Songs of the American Dream. Collector Records #1954, 1995, cassette and CD.
- The Music of American Politics. Collector Records #1955, 1996, cassette and CD.

== Bibliography ==
- Fowke, Edith; Glazer, Joe (1973). Songs of Work and Protest. New York: Dover Publications. ISBN 9780486228990. OCLC 260008507. )
- Glazer, Joe (2001). Labor's Troubadour. Urbana: University of Illinois Press. ISBN 9780252026126. OCLC 43913066.
