= Earl Dotter =

American photographer

Earl Lester Dotter
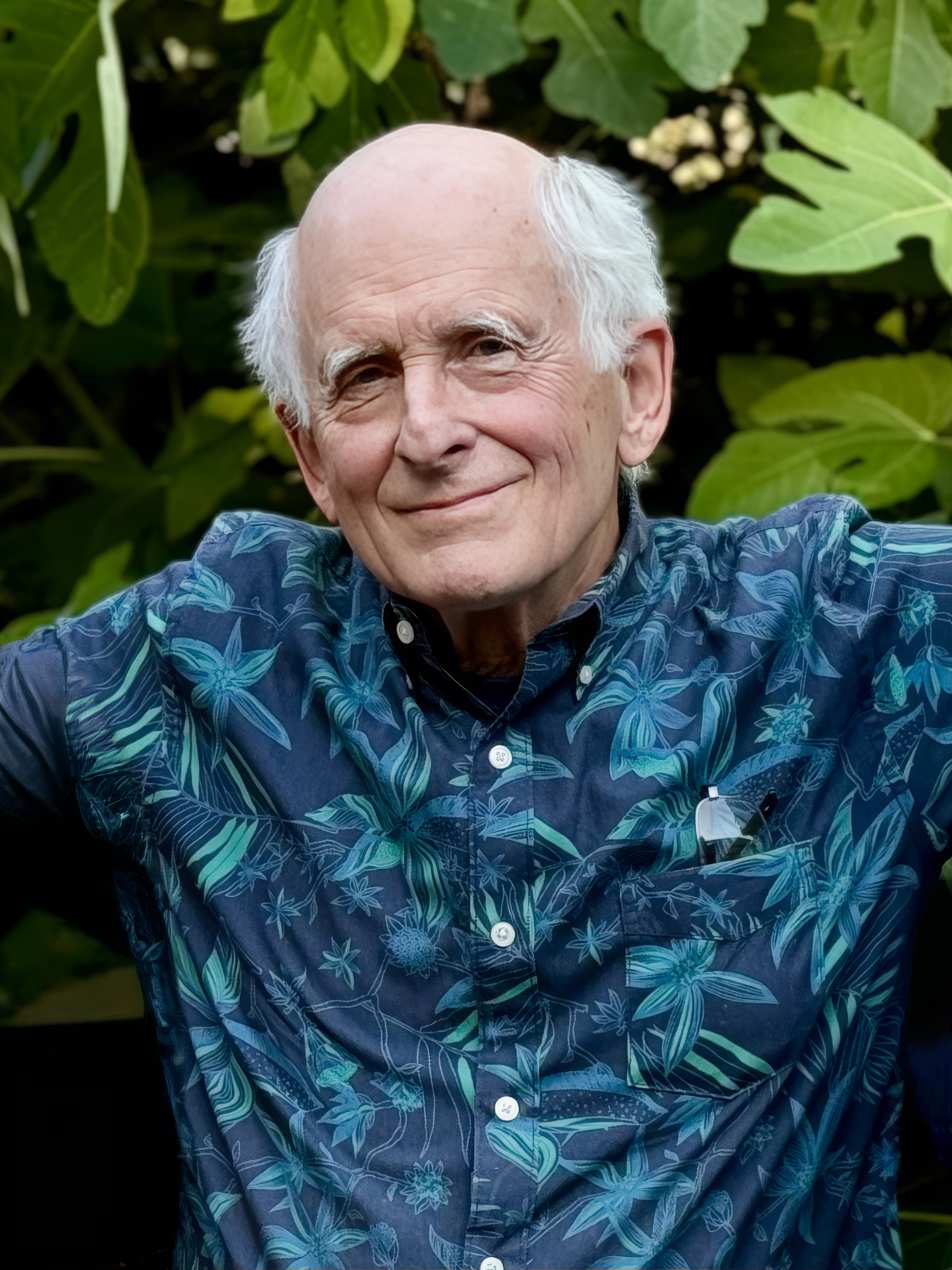
- Born: July 24, 1943 (age 83); Philadelphia, Pennsylvania, US
- Education: San Jose State College
- Occupation: Photographer
- Spouse: Deborah Stern
- Children: 4

Earl Dotter (born July 24, 1943) is an American occupational photographer best known for documenting some of America's most dangerous jobs, including coal mining, textile manufacturing, asbestos, emergency responders at the World Trade Center site, and healthcare workers during the COVID-19 pandemic. His work is included in the Smithsonian's National Portrait Gallery.

== Education ==
Dotter graduated from San Jose State College in 1967. While attending he purchased a Rolleiflex camera and started photographing the San Francisco Bay Area. By 1968 Dotter entered the School of Visual Arts in New York City. The next year he became a AmeriCorps VISTA volunteer.

== Career ==
Dotter documented dangerous mine work and black lung disease for the United Mine Workers of America. Many labor unions and the Occupational Safety and Health Administration have used his work. He has also participated in the Great Labor Arts Exchange. Dotter's photographs have been featured on the cover of New York Magazine and in The Saturday Evening Post.

One of Dotter's photographs was used on social media without permission as part of Russian interference in the 2016 United States elections, according to the Mueller report.

Dotter taught photography at Melvin J. Berman Hebrew Academy and has been a visiting scholar with the Harvard T.H. Chan School of Public Health for 25 years. His photography archive is being acquired by Duke University Libraries' David M. Rubenstein Rare Books and Manuscripts Library.

== Personal life ==
Dotter's wife, Deborah Stern, is a labor lawyer. They have been married 37 years and have four children.

== Awards ==
- 1976: National Magazine Award for The United Mine Workers Journal, sponsored by Columbia School of Journalism
- 1988: Leica Medal of Excellence Award, National Capital Region
- 2001: American Public Health Association’s Alice Hamilton Award
- 2015: Lifetime Achievement Award from New England College of Occupational and Environmental Medicine
- 2016: Asbestos Disease Awareness Organization’s Tribute of Inspiration Award

== Bibliography ==
- In Mine and Mill: A Photographic Portfolio of Coal Miners and Textile Workers. 1980. Pilgrim Press. ISBN 978-0829803884
- The Quiet Sickness: A Photographic Chronicle of Hazardous Work in America. 1998. ISBN 978-0932627858
- Life’s Work: A 50 Year Photographic Chronicle of Working in the U.S.A. 2018. Published by the American Industrial Hygiene Association. ISBN 978-1935082897
- Digging Our Own Graves: Coal Miners and the Struggle over Black Lung Disease. 2020. Written by Barbara Ellen Smith. Haymarket Books. ISBN 978-1642592757
