= Chris Llewellyn (poet) =

American poet

Chris Llewellyn is an American poet.

== Life ==
Llewellyn graduated from Warren Wilson College.

Llewellyn's work has appeared in Pudding House.

Llewellyn married a Justice Department lawyer, Edward Bordley. They live in northeast Washington, D.C., and have a daughter.

== Awards ==
- 1986 Walt Whitman Award

== Works ==
=== Poetry ===
- "Valentines; Praise". Capitol Hill Poetry Group.
- "Mirror-Writing" (PDF). VOICE newsletter. November 2008.
- Four Leaf Clover. s.n. 1973. chapbook
- The Avian Muses: A Collection of Poems. Warren Wilson College. 1990.
- Fragments from the Fire: the Triangle Shirtwaist Company fire of March 25, 1911. Viking. 1987. ISBN 978-0-670-81512-8.
- Steam Dummy & Fragments from the Fire. Bottom Dog Press. 1993. ISBN 978-0-933087-29-3.

=== Anthologies ===
- Peter Oresick, Nicholas Coles, ed. (1990). Working classics. University of Illinois Press. ISBN 978-0-252-06133-2.
- Hasia R. Diner; Jeffrey Shandler; Beth S. Wenger, eds. (December 1, 2000). Remembering the Lower East Side. Indiana University Press. ISBN 978-0-253-33788-7.
- Kamal Boullata; Kathy Engel, eds. (2007). We begin here: poems for Palestine and Lebanon. Interlink Books. ISBN 978-1-56656-687-2.
