= Jimmy Kelly (footballer, born 1907) =

English footballer

Personal information
- Full name: James Edward Kelly
- Date of birth: 29 December 1907
- Place of birth: Seaham Harbour, County Durham, England
- Date of death: 27 July 1984 (aged 76)
- Place of death: Oldham, Greater Manchester, England
- Height: 5 ft 9 in (1.75 m)
- Position: Full back

Senior career*
Years	Team	Apps	(Gls)
- Dawdon Colliery
–1928	Murton Colliery		
1928–1931	Southport	7	(0)
1931–1933	Barrow	55	(0)
1933–1938	Grimsby Town	160	(3)
1938	Bradford Park Avenue	2	(0)
1938–1939	York City	24	(0)
–1946	Trondheim		
1946–	Barrow	1	(0)
Total		249	(3)
- * Club domestic league appearances and goals

James Edward Kelly (29 December 1907 – 27 July 1984) was an English professional footballer who played as a full back in the Football League for Southport, Barrow, Grimsby Town, Bradford Park Avenue and York City, in Norwegian football for Trondheim and in non-League football for Dawdon Colliery and Murton Colliery. He later worked as a trainer at Barrow and Oldham Athletic and scouted for Grimsby.
