= James E. Kelly (artist) =

American artist (1855–1933)

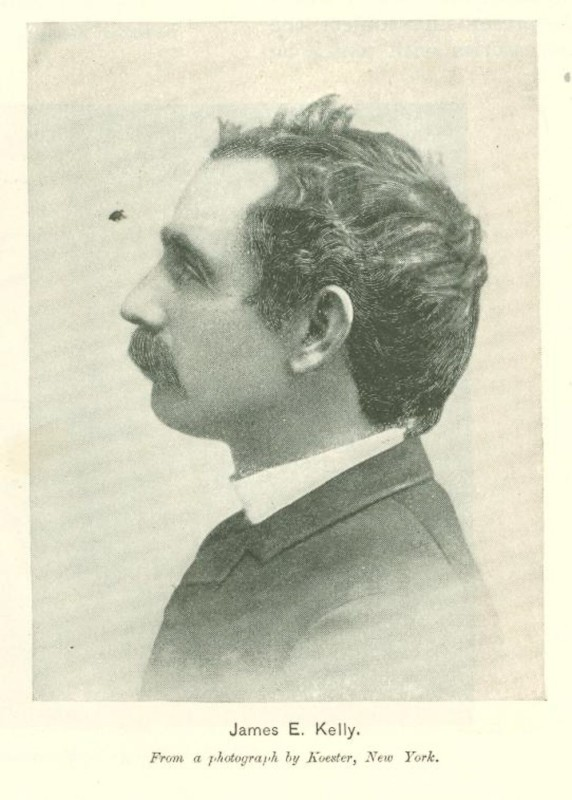
- Born: July 30, 1855; New York City
- Died: May 25, 1933 (aged 77); New York City
- Known for: Sculptor, Illustrator
- Notable work: General Buford Memorial; Washington in Prayer; Caesar Rodney

James Edward Kelly (July 30, 1855 – May 25, 1933) was an American sculptor and illustrator who specialized in depicting people and events of American wars, particularly the American Civil War.

== Biography ==
Born in New York City, he was six years old when the Civil War started. Perhaps because of that he early developed a lifelong interest in American history, particularly in the Civil War and in the generals who fought it. His intense studies into history allowed Kelly to bring to his work a degree of detail that makes his drawings and statues noteworthy.

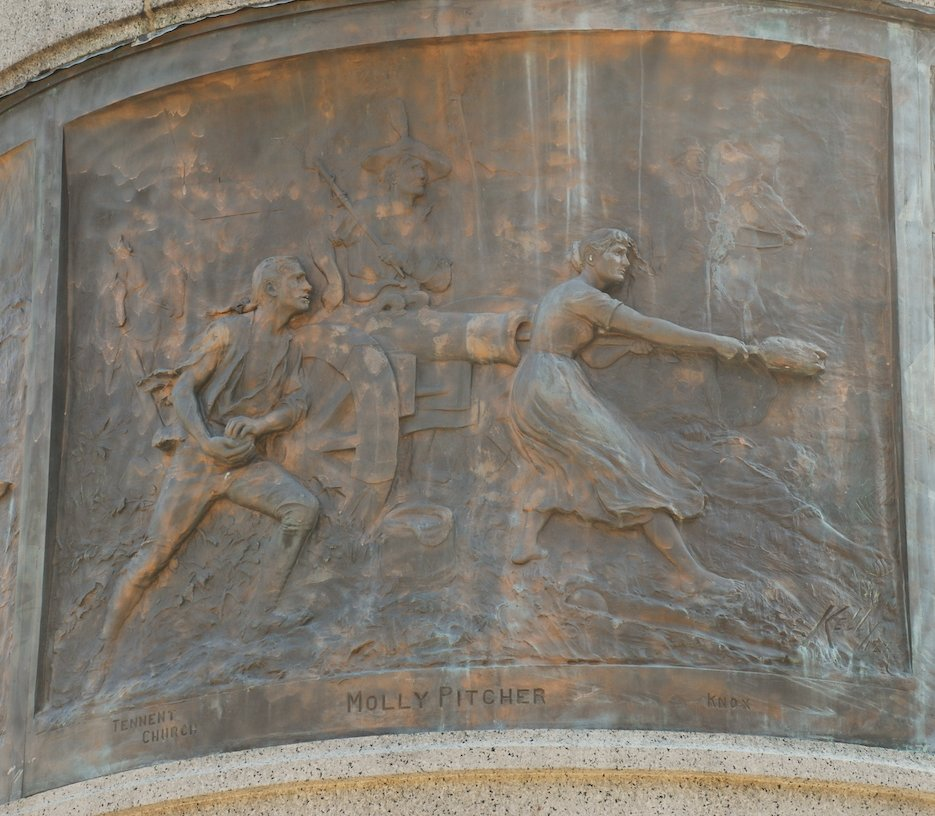
Molly Pitcher (1884), Monmouth Battle Monument, Freehold, New Jersey.

He studied at the National Academy of Design, and was one of the founders of the Art Students League of New York. He worked as a wood engraver, as an illustrator for Harper's Monthly and other magazines, and for a time shared a studio with artist Edwin Austin Abbey.

In 1882, Kelly was commissioned by Oscar Wilde and his touring manager to make a sketch of Wilde for use in promoting Wilde's lecture tour of North America.

Kelly, Daniel Chester French, and Cyrus Edwin Dallin were the finalists in an 1883 national design competition to model an equestrian statue of Paul Revere for Boston, Massachusetts. Dallin won the competition and the commission.

Kelly's first major commission was for the 1884 Monmouth Battle Monument – five bronze relief panels depicting scenes from the battle. He had a difficult time finding models who did not have mustaches or beards – then being worn by most men of that era – so he prevailed upon a friend from nearby Menlo Park, New Jersey, to pose for him. Because of that, a portrait of the 30-year-old Thomas Alva Edison can be found on the monument as Molly Pitcher's wounded husband.

Kelly was known for his extremely detailed and accurate engravings on historical subjects, often commissioned by magazines. He was a careful researcher, interviewing the soldiers present at the Civil War battles he depicted, and exacting about getting the details right in his works. Late in life, he hoped to publish a book of his interviews with generals and other Civil War soldiers, but there was little interest.

He married Helen McKay (1871–1929), but no children survived them. He died in New York City, and was buried in an unmarked grave in Saint Raymond's Cemetery.

There is some evidence that Kelly made a Bust of a young Thomas Edison in 1878, according to Francis Jehl. Any evidence of this plaster or bronze sculpture is sought by scholar Allen Koenigsberg - a Museum Display in 2013 of the one surviving example was dated to "1900."

Historian William B. Styple edited Kelly's sometimes-provocative military interviews into a 2005 book, Generals in Bronze. Styple also raised funds to buy a headstone for Kelly's grave. On October 1, 2006, a black granite monument with Kelly's image carved into it and the words, "A Sculptor of American History" was placed over the artist's previously unmarked grave.

== Selected works ==
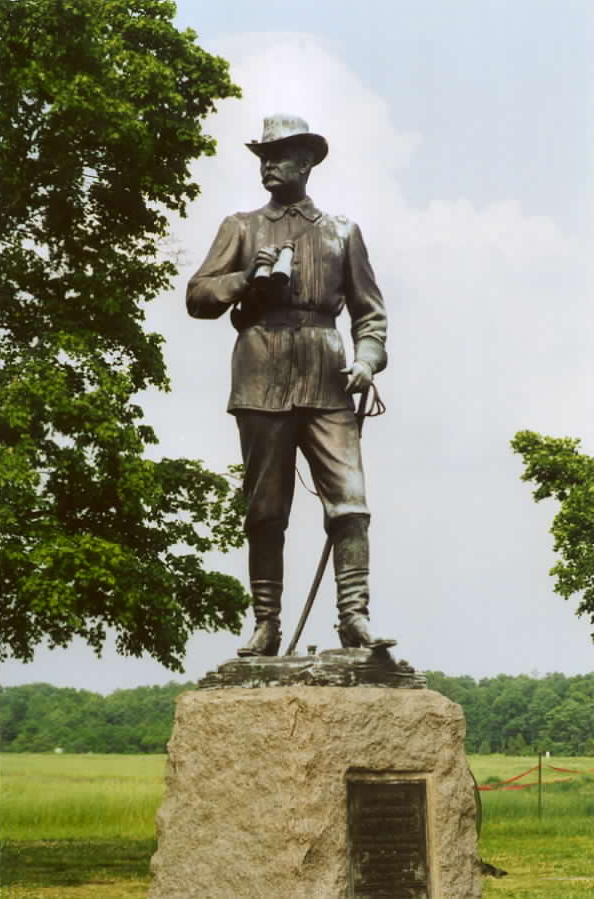
General John Buford Memorial (1895), Gettysburg Battlefield.

- Statuette of Sheridan's Ride, 1879.
- Statuette of Paul Revere's Ride, 1883.
- Five relief panels, Monmouth Battle Monument, Freehold, New Jersey, 1884:
  - Ramsey Defending His Guns
  - Washington Rallying the Troops
  - Molly Pitcher
  - Wayne's Charge
  - Council of War at Hopewell, June 24, 1778
- 6th New York Cavalry Monument, Gettysburg Battlefield, Gettysburg, Pennsylvania, 1889.
  - Relief panel of General Fitzhugh's Charge
- Soldiers and Sailors Monument, Troy, New York, 1890.
  - The Call to Arms, a 17-foot (5.2 m) bronze figure of a goddess grasping a sword and a trumpet, stands atop the granite column.
  - Caspar Buberl modeled the four relief panels: Cavalry, Artillery, Infantry, The Monitor and the Merrimac
- Civil War Soldiers & Sailors Monument, Philipse Manor Hall State Historic Site, Yonkers, New York, 1891.
  - Kelly designed three of the four bronze figures: Cavalryman, Infantryman, Artilleryman.
  - Washington Irving Chambers designed the Sailor figure, and Lorado Taft carved the granite soldier atop the monument.
- General John Buford Memorial, Gettysburg Battlefield, Gettysburg, Pennsylvania, 1895.
- Medallion of Battle of Long Island, before 1896.
- General Horatio G. Wright Monument. Arlington National Cemetery, Arlington, Virginia, c. 1899.
- Commander Edward M. Hughes Memorial Tablet, United States Naval Academy, Annapolis, Maryland, after 1903.
- Relief panel of General George Washington in Prayer at Valley Forge, Federal Hall National Memorial, New York City, 1904.
- Equestrian statue of General Fitz-John Porter, Haven Park, Portsmouth, New Hampshire, 1904.
  - Dedication plaque and 3 relief panels: Capture of Mexico City, Charging Malvern Hill, Balloon Reconnoitering.
- William McKinley Memorial, Park Drive & West Street, Wilmington, Delaware, 1906.
- Bust of Major General James H. Wilson, United States Military Academy, West Point, New York, 1909.
- Memorial to the Defenders of New Haven, Defenders' Park, New Haven, Connecticut, 1911.
- Rochambeau Monument, Marion Avenue, Southington, Connecticut, 1912.
- Barbara Fritchie Monument, Mount Olivet Cemetery, Frederick, Maryland, 1914.
- Equestrian statue of Caesar Rodney, Rodney Square, Wilmington, Delaware, 1922.
  - A statuette of Caesar Rodney and paintings by Kelly are at the Delaware Art Museum.
- Bust of General Oliver Otis Howard, Howard University, Washington, D.C.
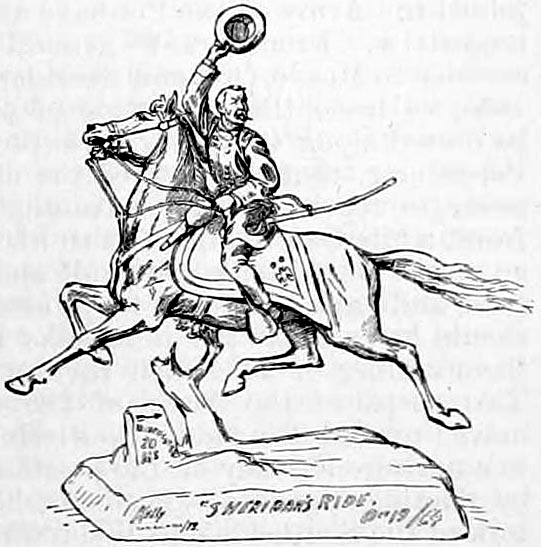
Sheridan's Ride (1879).

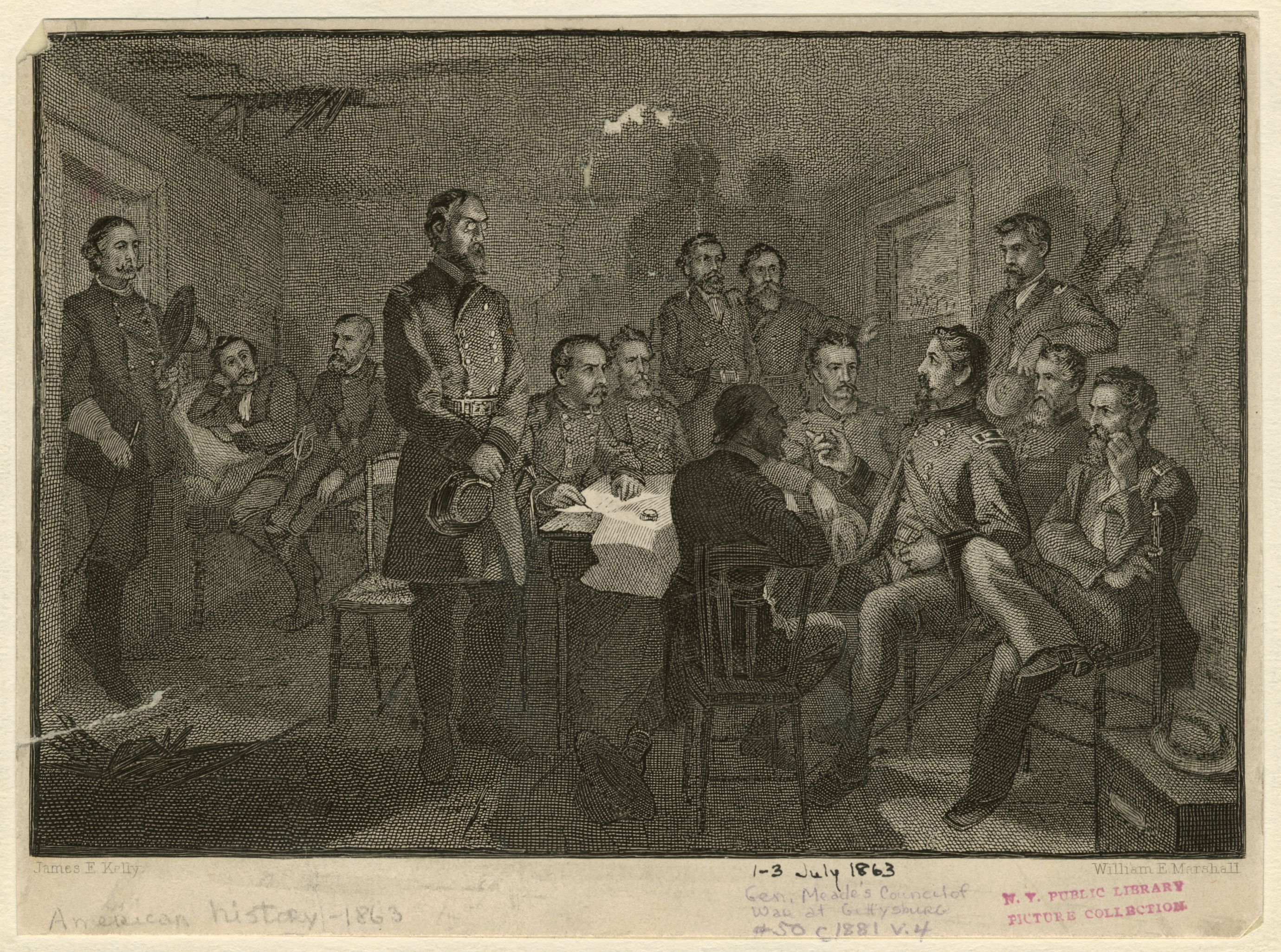
Council of War at Gettysburg, July 2, 1863. (1880s).

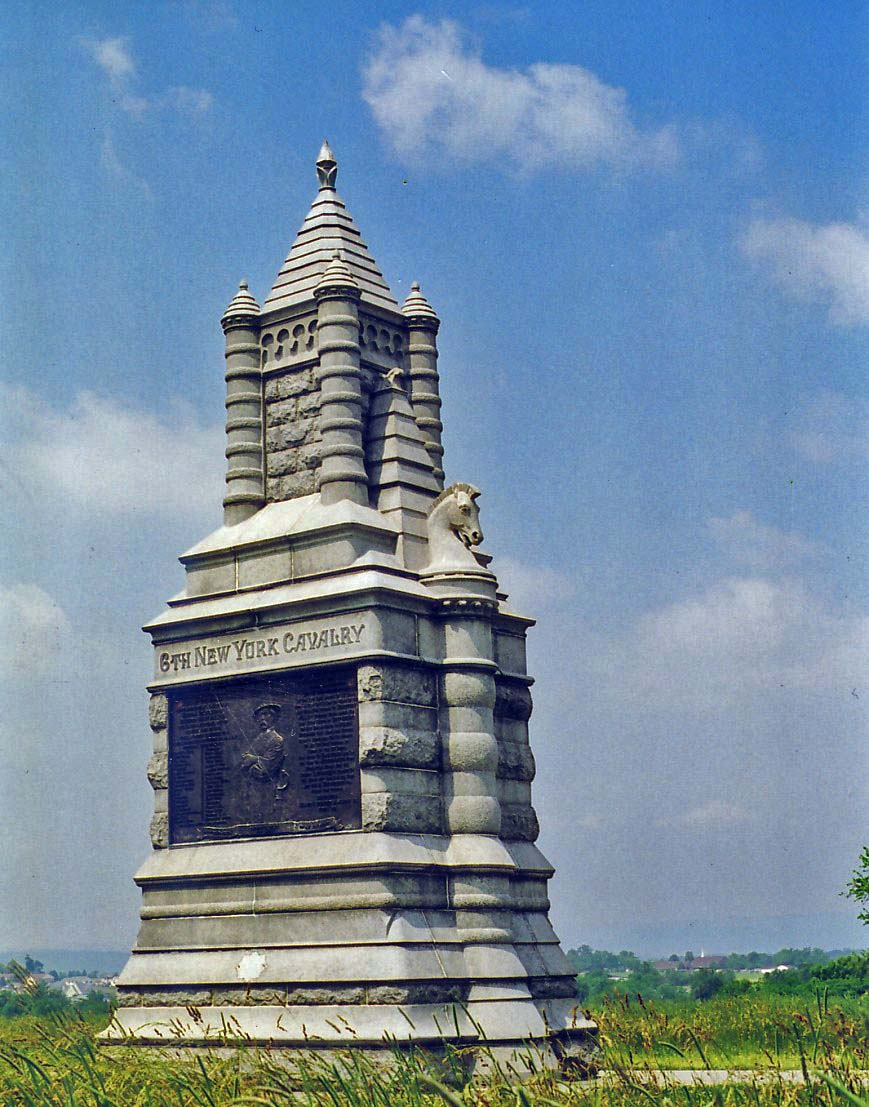
6th New York Cavalry Monument (1889), Gettysburg Battlefield.

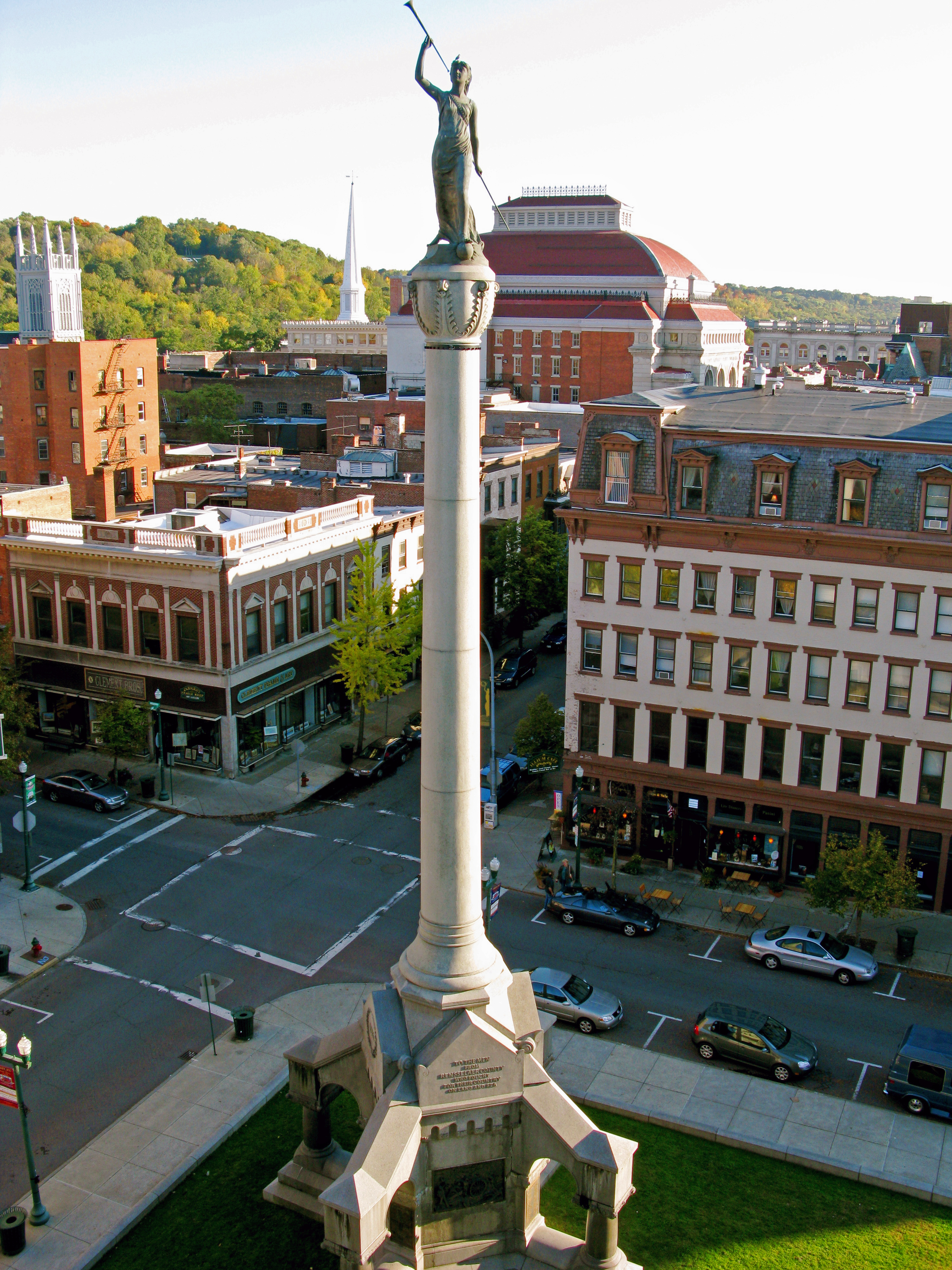
Soldiers & Sailors Monument (1890), Troy, New York.

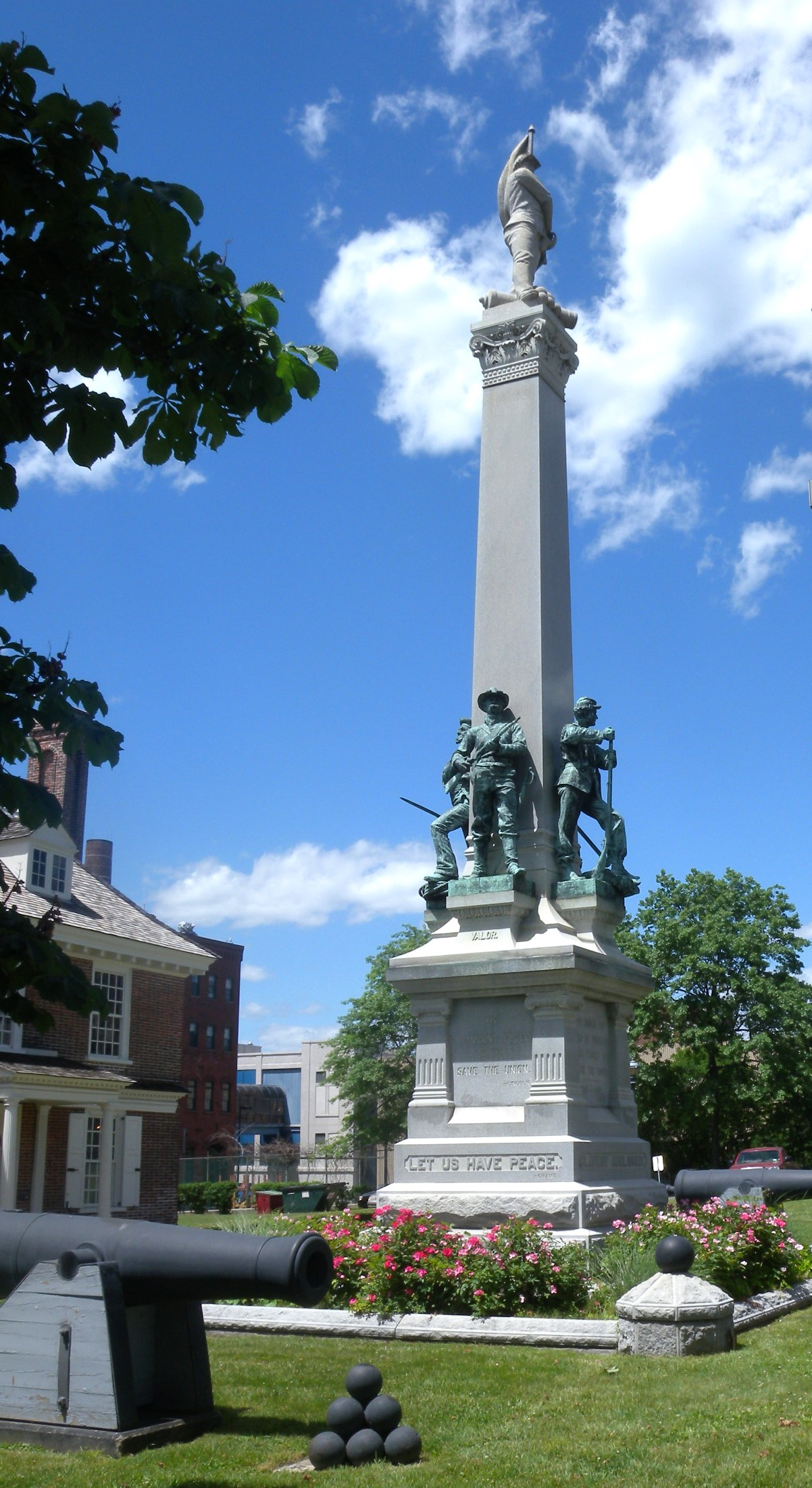
Civil War Soldiers & Sailors Monument (1891), Yonkers, New York.

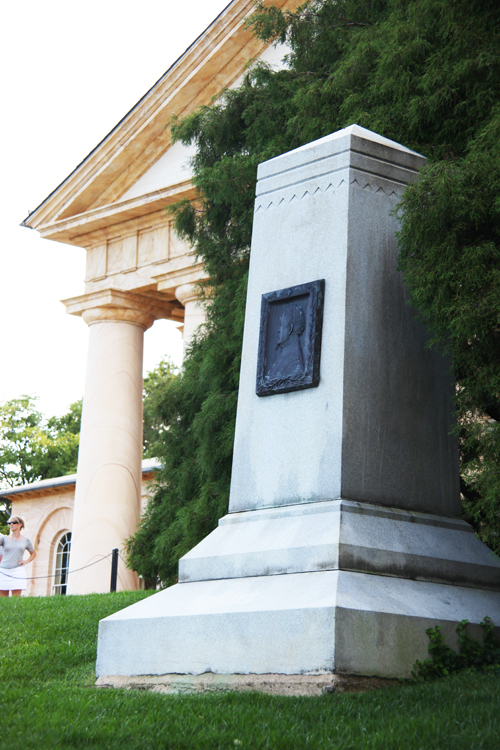
General Horatio G. Wright Monument (c. 1899), Arlington National Cemetery.

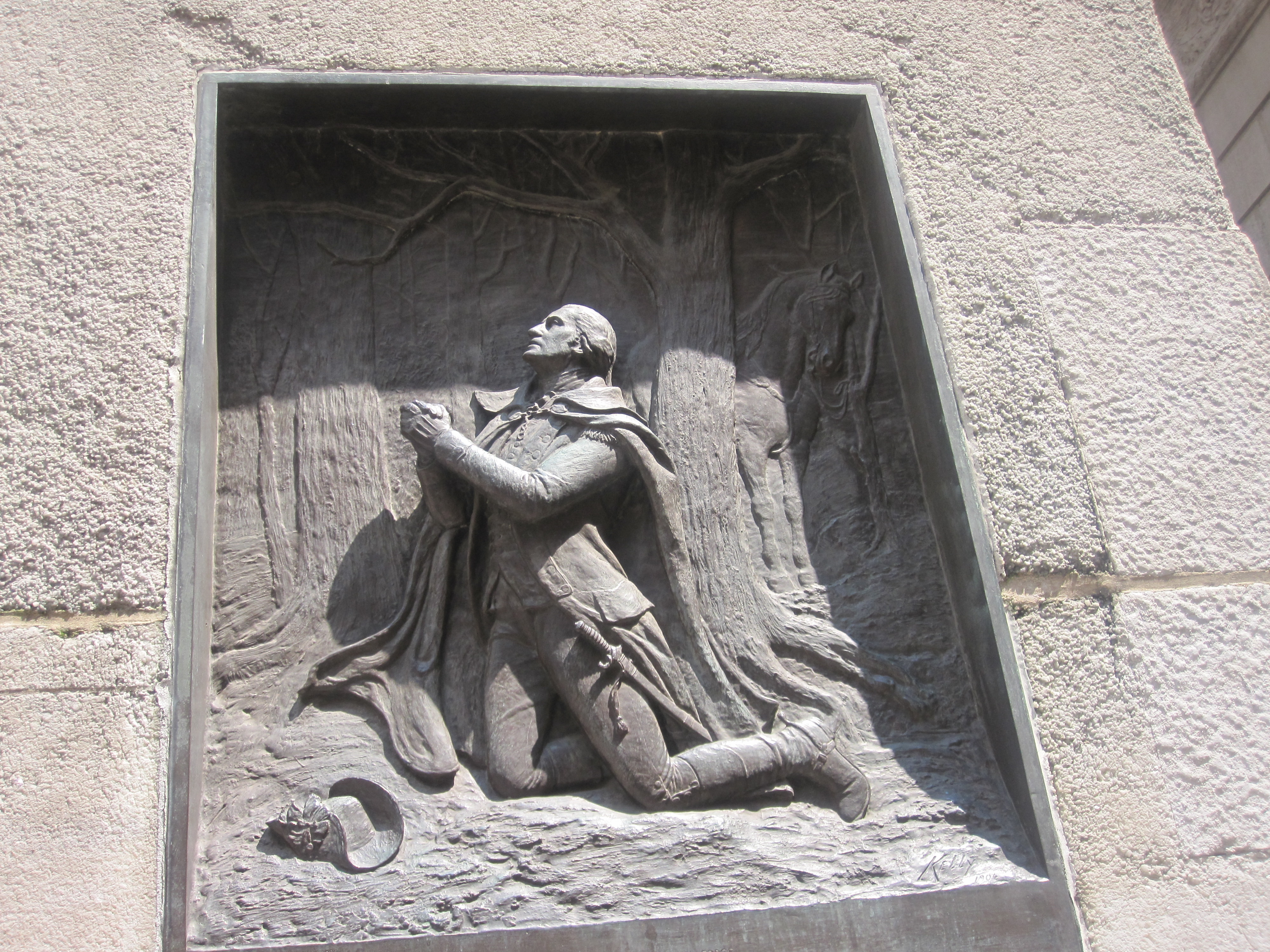
Washington in Prayer at Valley Forge (1904), Federal Hall National Memorial, New York City.

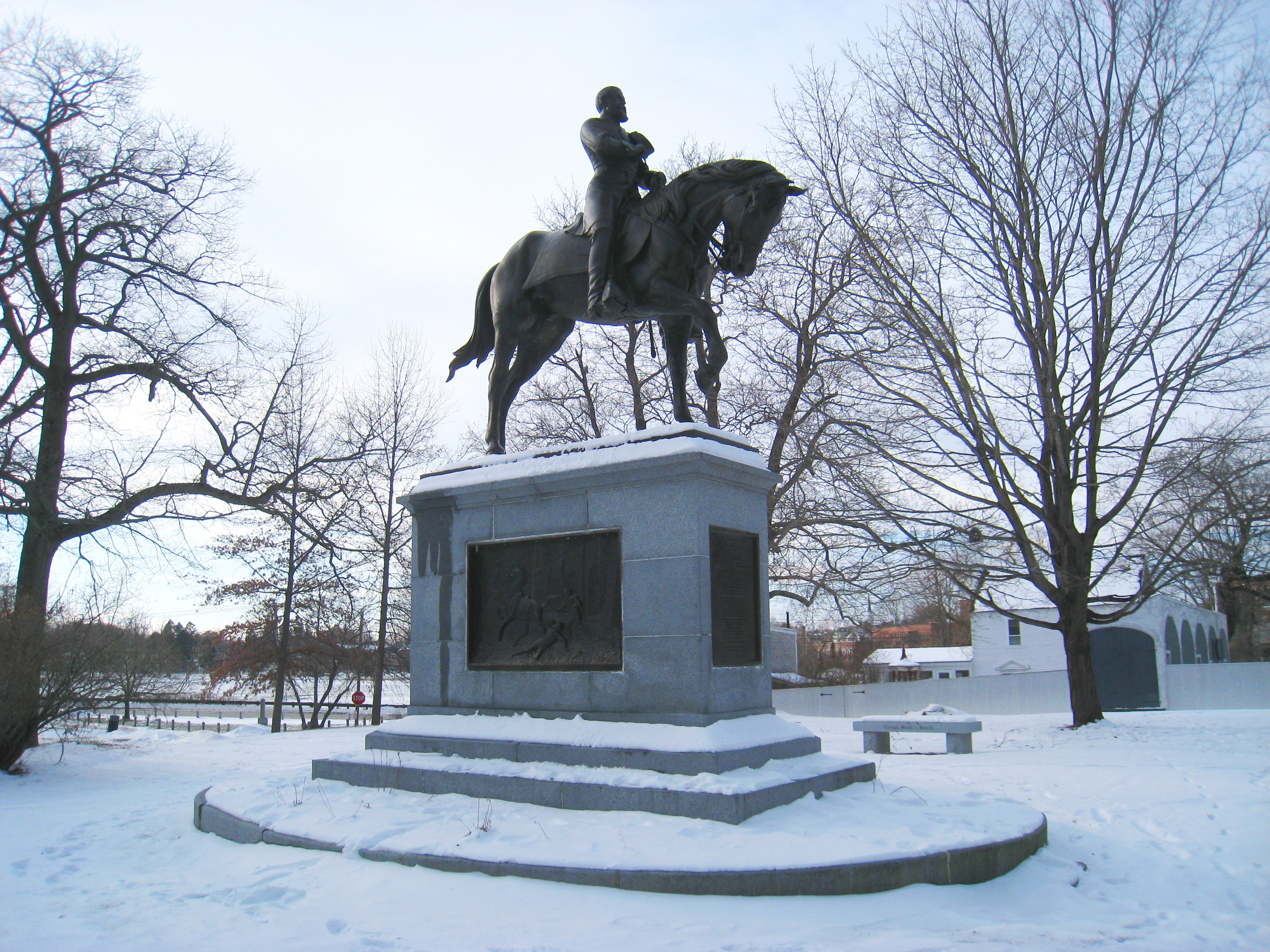
General Fitz-John Porter (1904), Portsmouth, New Hampshire.

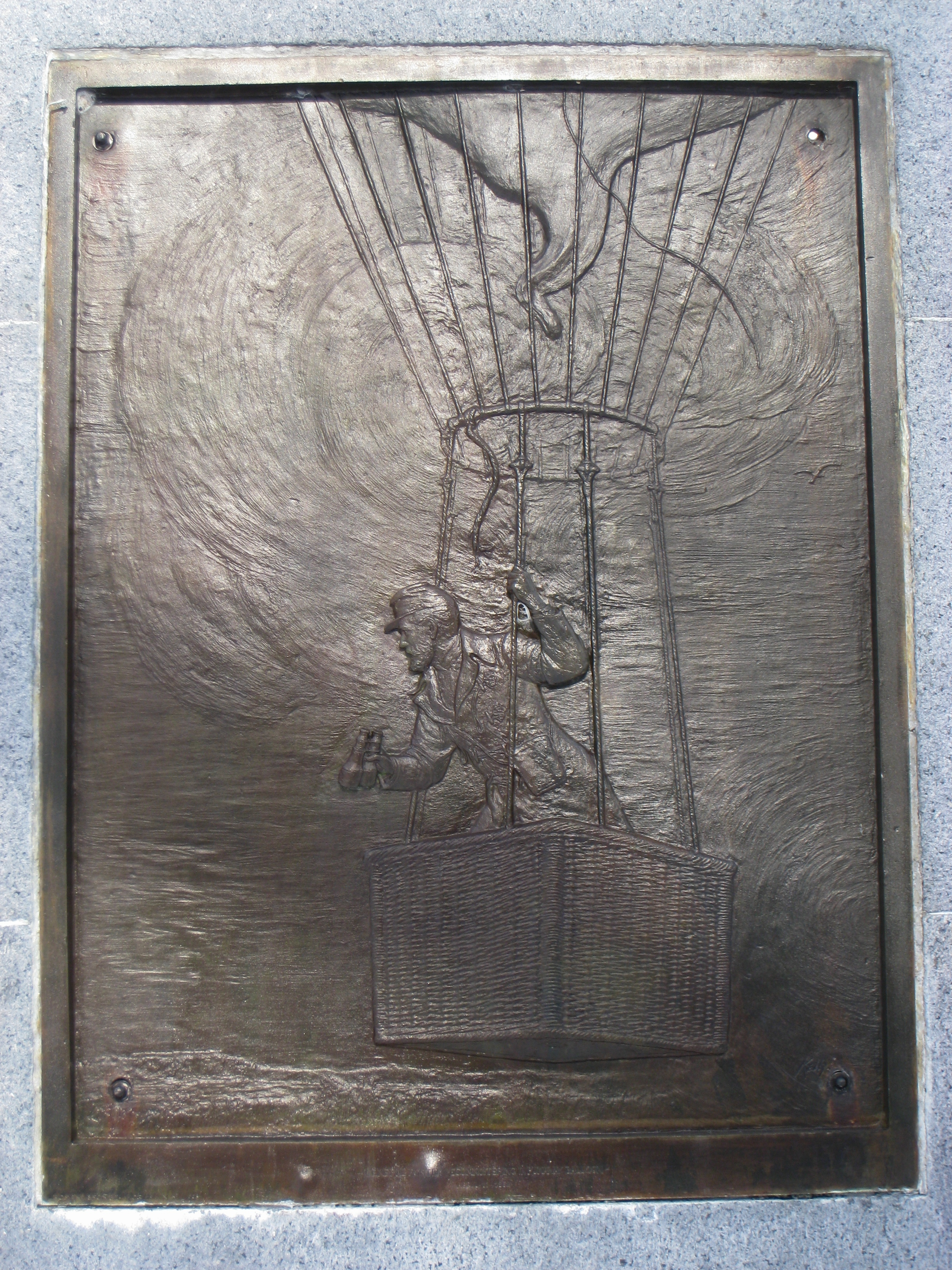
Balloon Reconnoitering. Relief panel on base of Porter statue.

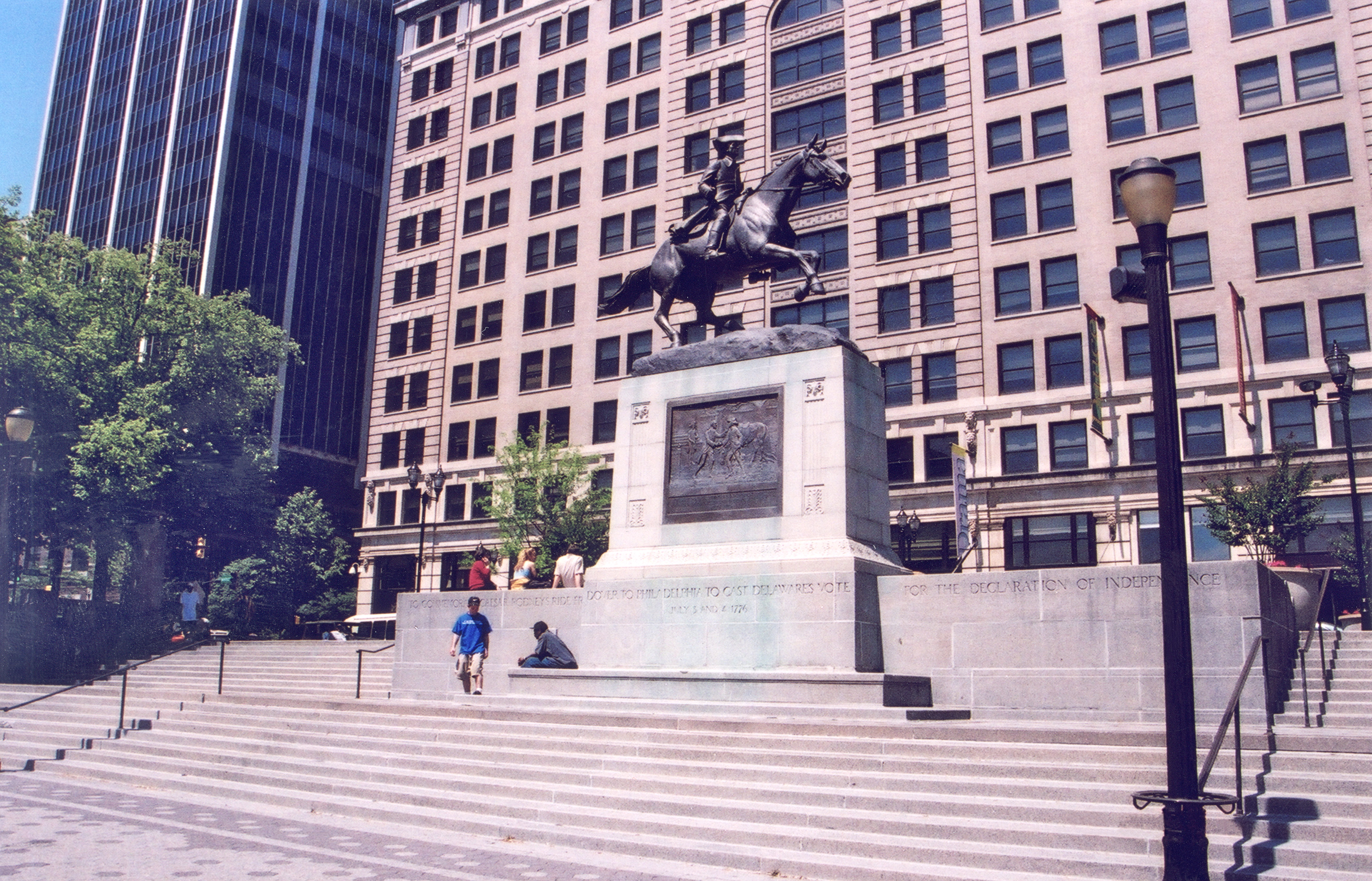
Caesar Rodney (1922), Wilmington, Delaware.

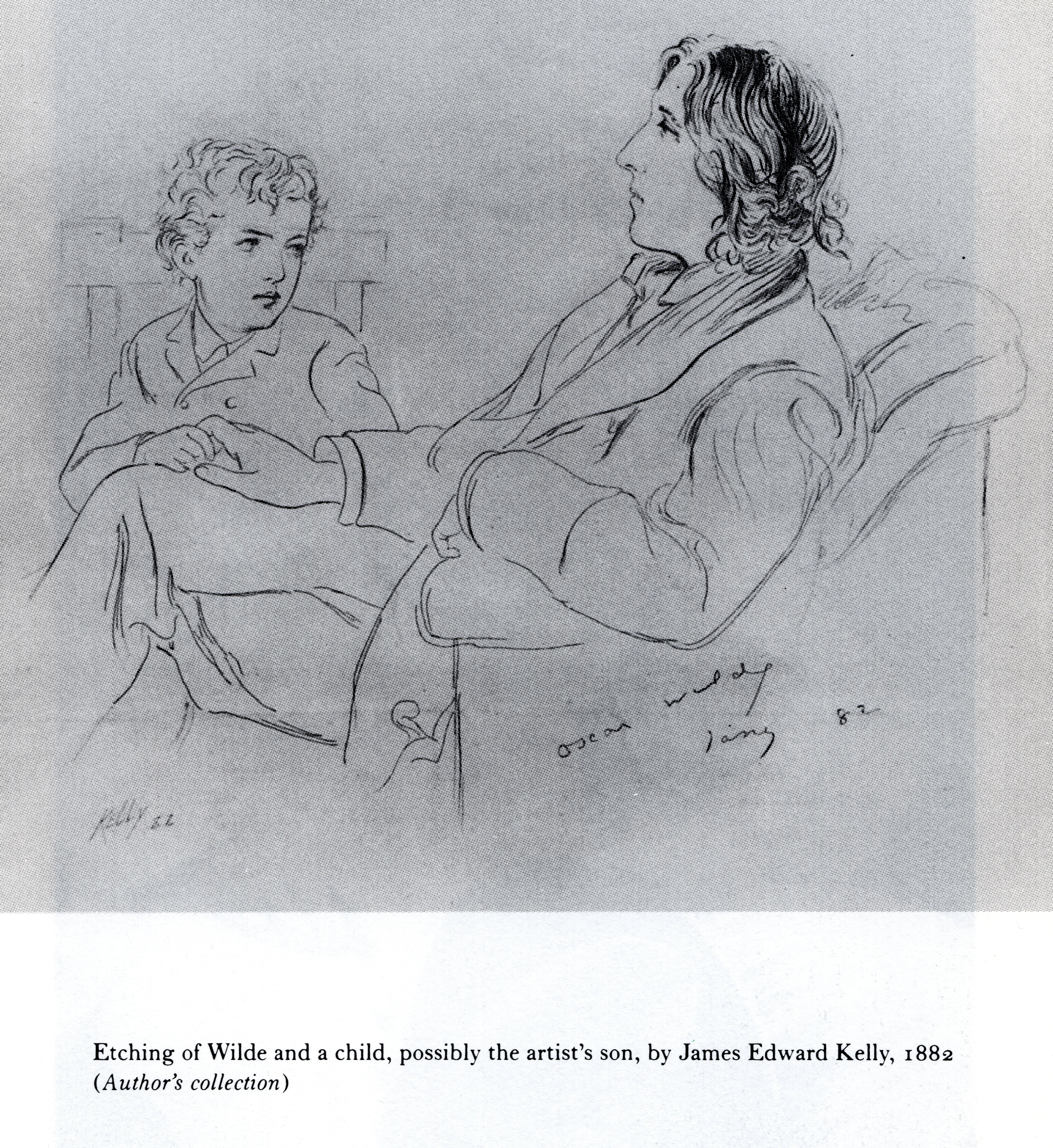
Etching Oscar Wilde and a child.

== Sources ==
- Hawthorne, Frederick W. Gettysburg: Stories of Men and Monuments. Gettysburg, PA: Association of Licensed Battlefield Guides, 1988. ISBN 0-9657444-0-X.
- Leach, Anna "A Sculptor of American History," Munsey's Magazine, vol. 14, no. 4 (January 1896), pp. 446–52.
- Opitz, Glenn B., ed. Mantle Fielding's Dictionary of American Painters, Sculptors & Engravers. Poughkeepsie, NY: Apollo Books, 1986. ISBN 978-0-938290-04-9.
- Styple, William B. Generals in Bronze: Interviewing the Commanders of the Civil War. Kearny, NJ: Belle Grove Publishing, 2005. ISBN 1-883926-18-1.
- Whittemore, Francis Davis. George Washington in Sculpture. Boston: Marshall Jones Co., 1933. OCLC 895551.
