= National Labor College =

Private college in Silver Spring, Maryland, US (1969–2014)

- Type: Private coeducational labor college
- Active: 1969–2014
- Affiliations: AFL–CIO
- President: Paula Peinovich
- Faculty: 6 full-time
- Undergraduates: 1,364
- Location: Silver Spring, Maryland, US
- Website: nlc.edu

The National Labor College was a college for union members and their families, union leaders and union staff in Silver Spring, Maryland, US. Established as a training center by the AFL–CIO in 1969 to strengthen union member education and organizing skills, NLC became a degree-granting college in 1997 and in March 2004 gained accreditation from the Middle States Commission on Higher Education. Until the college closed on April 26, 2014, it was the only college of its kind in the United States.

In July 2014 the Amalgamated Transit Union purchased the National Labor College campus. The ATU plans to expand its long-standing union education and activism program to the newly acquired campus.

== History ==
In 1969 AFL–CIO President George Meany founded a labor studies center under the direction of Fred K. Hoehler Jr. to promote education and training opportunities for union leadership and rank-and-file members. The Executive Council of the AFL–CIO determined an educational and training center held an important role in the organization's effort to further develop trade unionism, and decided to locate a permanent campus for the pursuit of labor studies.

On November 6, 1974, AFL–CIO President George Meany dedicated the George Meany Center for Labor Studies, located on the former campus of Xaverian College. The property was purchased from the Xaverian Brothers by the AFL–CIO for $2.5 million in 1971. At the dedication, Meany remarked that the purpose of the institution was to help union officials "make a better contribution to our people and to our nation." The Bachelor of Arts Degree in Labor Studies was offered in partnership with Antioch College (later Antioch University) through the 1990s.

In 1997 under the leadership of AFL–CIO President John J. Sweeney, the center received authorization to grant baccalaureate degrees by the State of Maryland Higher Education Commission and became an independent institution of higher learning and renamed the National Labor College. By 2004, National Labor College had become fully accredited by the Middle States Association of Colleges and Schools.

The National Labor College published Labor's Heritage, a scholarly journal of labor history, until 2004.

In the fall of 2006 the new Lane Kirkland Center opened on the National Labor College campus, to provide upgraded facilities, and to greatly expand the college's hosting capabilities. At the time, the college hoped to promote the Kirkland Center as "America's union hall".

In 2009, the college entered into a partnership with Penn Foster Education, a career college subsidiary of the Princeton Review in order to develop a distance education program. The program was ended by the college in November, 2011, because of the slow growth of the program and the financial difficulties of the Princeton Review. The college intended to use the facilities developed under this program to build its own program of distance education. The losses from the joint program were in part responsible for the 2012 decision to close the college's campus and function in online education only.

== Facilities ==
With a 47-acre (190,000 m^{2}) campus located in Silver Spring, Maryland, a 72,000-square-foot (6,700 m^{2}) academic and conference center, and hotel quality residence halls, the college provided classroom, meeting spaces and dining services.

In 2012, the college announced its intention to sell the campus and relocate to offices in the Washington, DC area and have an online presence only. Plagued by roughly $30 million in debt—primarily from building the conference center—the college depended heavily on the sale of the campus to remain open. National Labor College was on the verge of selling its campus when the deal fell through in June 2013. The AFL–CIO stated it did not have enough money available to provide a bridge loan. After the college closed, the campus was sold.

== George Meany Memorial Archives ==
From 1993 until 2013, the college was home to the George Meany Memorial Archives, the official and acting archives of the AFL–CIO. The archive is estimated to have a value of $25 million and contain more than 40 million artifacts. The archives include the papers of numerous labor leaders, the official records of all AFL–CIO proceedings since the founding of the AFL in the 1880s, the archives of numerous union and federation publications, and the records of the departments of the AFL–CIO. The archives contain extensive correspondence relating to past AFL–CIO international activities during the Cold War which remain classified by most national governments.

On October 1, 2013, the collection was transferred from the National Labor College to the University of Maryland Libraries, where university archivists are preserving the archive to make them more readily available to the public. Records of the National Labor College are also available in the Special Collections at University of Maryland.

== National Workers Memorial ==
The National Workers Memorial, dedicated on April 28, 2010, was erected on the college's campus to honor the memory of workers killed or fatally injured on the job, or in service to the labor movement. After the sale of the campus, the college intends to relocate the memorial to an appropriate location. Australia established a National Workers Memorial, a memorial with a similar intent, in its national capital, Canberra, Australian Capital Territory, in 2013.

== Closure ==
On November 12, 2013, the National Labor College Board of Trustees directed Peinovich and the college's officers to develop a plan to close the college due to the institution's ongoing financial difficulties. In an open letter three days later to the college's community of students, alumni and supporters, Peinovich announced that the college closure would likely take many months and emphasized that there would be a "teach-out" plan to allow enrolled students to receive their degrees. The Labor College signed teach-out agreements with SUNY Empire State College, Thomas Edison State College, Pennsylvania State University, the University of Illinois, and Rowan University that allowed NLC students to receive their degrees by earning credit at those five institutions. The college held its last commencement and a closing convocation on its Silver Spring campus on April 26, 2014. The final NLC commencement, for those enrolled in the 'teach-out', occurred on Saturday, January 30, 2016, at the Conference Center at the Maritime Institute (formerly known as MITAGS).
