= Ralph Fasanella =

American painter

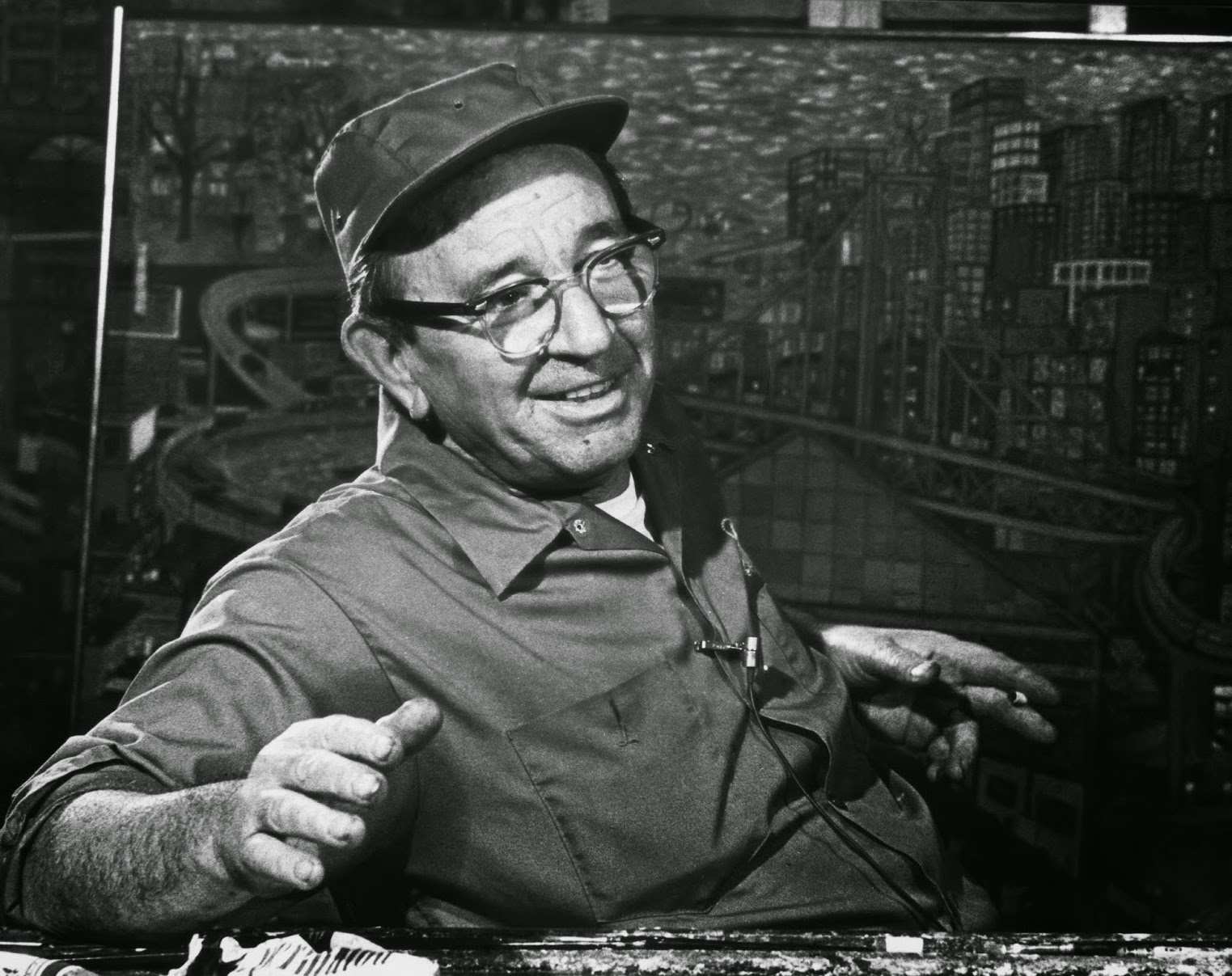
Fasanella c. 1973

Ralph Fasanella (September 2, 1914 – December 16, 1997) was an American self-taught painter whose large, detailed works depicted urban working life and critiqued post-World War II America.

== Early life ==
Ralph Fasanella was born to Joseph and Ginevra (Spagnoletti), Italian immigrants, in the Bronx on Labor Day in 1914. He was the third of six children. His father delivered ice to local homes. His mother worked in a neighborhood dress shop drilling holes into buttons, and spent her spare time as an anti-fascist activist.

Fasanella spent much of his youth delivering ice with his father from a horse-driven wagon. This experience deeply impressed him. He saw his father as representative of all working men, beaten down day after day and struggling for survival. "Fasanella later said that the compositional density of his pictures was influenced by the experience of helping his father deliver ice, which involved removing all the food from customers' refrigerators and arranging it in neatly ordered stacks."

Fasanella's mother was a literate, sensitive, progressive woman. She instilled in Fasanella a strong sense of social justice and political awareness. Fasanella began accompanying his mother when she worked on anti-fascist and trade union causes. Fasanella also helped his mother publish and distribute a small Italian-language, anti-fascist newspaper to help support the family.

Joseph Fasanella abandoned his family and returned to Italy in the 1920s. This increased the influence Fasanella's mother had over young Ralph, but it also led to some behavioral problems.

Fasanella served two stints in reform schools run by the Catholic Church for truancy and running away from home. He later said he was sexually abused ("used as a girl") by the priests. These experiences instilled a deep dislike for authority and reinforced Fasanella's hatred for anything which broke people's spirits. Fasanella later depicted his experience in reform school in a painting titled Lineup at the Protectory 2 (1961). The melancholy image features rows of boys standing at attention, watched over by scowling, ominous-looking priests. Fasanella quit school after the sixth grade.

During the Great Depression, Fasanella worked as a textile worker in garment factories and as a truck driver. He became a member of United Electrical, Radio and Machine Workers of America (UE) Local 1227 while working as a machinist in Brooklyn. He became strongly aware of the growing economic and social injustice in the U.S., as well as the plight and powerlessness of the working class.

In late 1930s, Ralph Fasanella volunteered to fight in the Abraham Lincoln Brigade, an American paramilitary force fighting to support the Second Spanish Republic against the successful fascist rebellion led by General Francisco Franco.

== Union organizing career ==
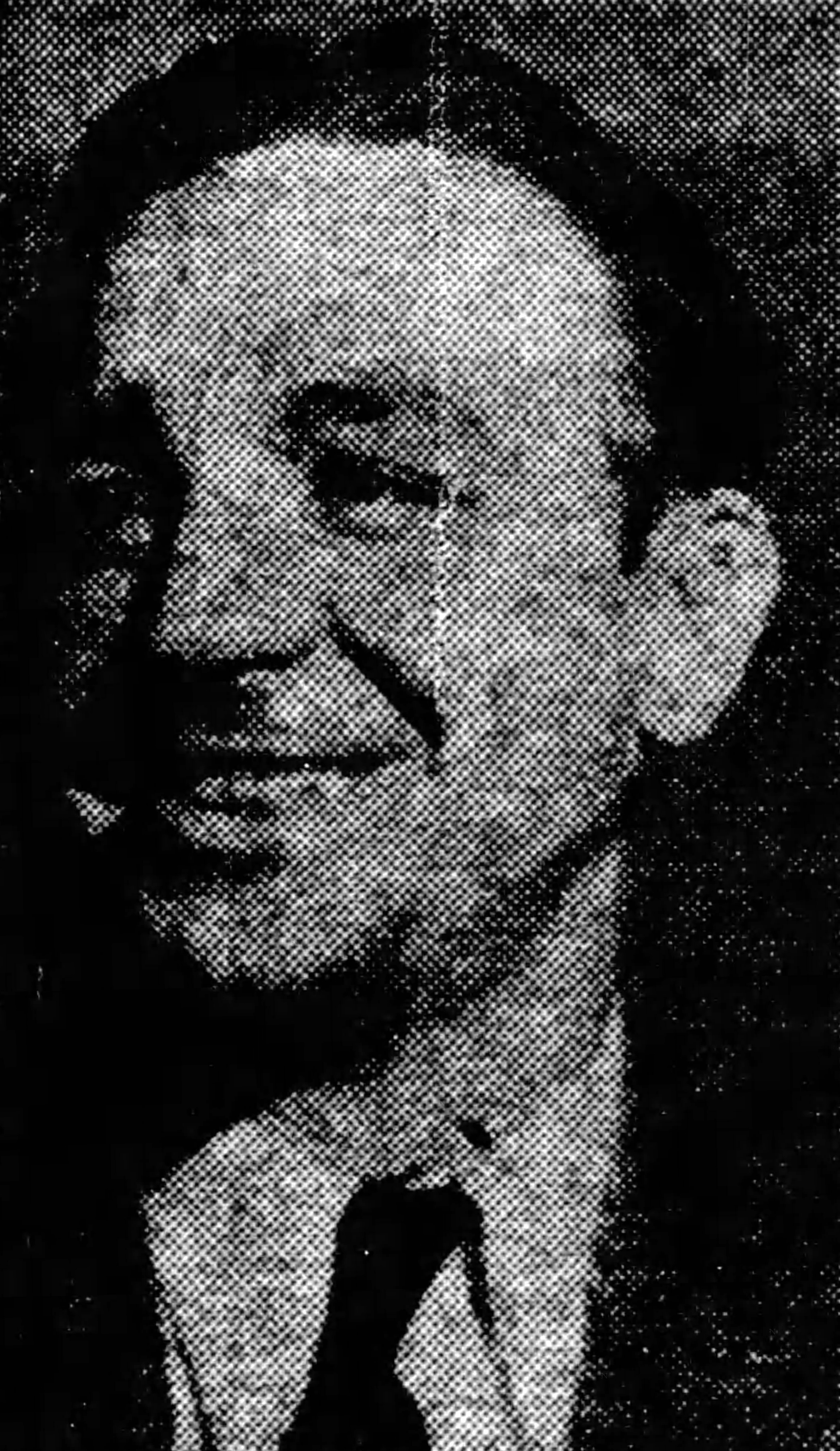
Fasanella c. 1946

After the Spanish Civil War, Fasanella returned to the United States, where he began organizing labor unions.

Fasanella joined the UE staff in 1940. He organized a Western Electric manufacturing plant in Manhattan, a Sperry Gyroscope factory, and a number of other electrical equipment and machine plants in and around New York City. One of his later paintings shows a union organizing committee meeting being held in a UE hall.

It was during a UE organizing drive in 1940 that Fasanella first began to draw.

Fasanella married Matilda Weiss in 1943. The short-lived marriage ended in 1944.

In 1949, Fasanella was the American Labor Party candidate for New York City Council in the 20th district. He came in third place with 9% of the vote.

== Painting career ==
In the mid-1940s, Fasanella began to suffer from intense finger pain caused by arthritis. A union co-worker suggested that he take up painting as a way to exercise his fingers and ease the pain.

In 1945, Fasanella persuaded the UE to organize painting classes for its members at a local college. He was one of the first members to sign up for classes.

Fasanella became consumed by art, and left labor union organizing to paint full-time. To pay the bills, he bought a service station and worked there.

Fasanella's painting focused on city life, men and women at work, union meetings, strikes, sit-ins and baseball games. He quickly developed a style which spoke to workers and the poor through the use of familiar details. Fasanella improvised a quasi-surrealist style, depicting interiors and exteriors or past and future simultaneously. He painted canvases as big as 10 feet across because he envisioned his paintings hanging in large union meeting halls.

" 'I always felt embarrassed by the whole thing,' he said, 'but I had to do it.' "

Fasanella's art was highly improvisational. He never planned out works, and rarely revised them. He said of his 1948 painting May Day, it "just came out of my belly. I never planned it. I don't know how I did it."

His first solo show was at the ACA Galleries in New York City in 1948. One of his first sales was to choreographer Jerome Robbins.

In 1950, Fasanella married Eva Lazorek, a school teacher. They had a son, Marc, and a daughter, Gina.

Fasanella's opinionated, leftist-oriented artwork caused him to be blacklisted among art dealers and galleries during the McCarthy era. His wife supported him by teaching school.

Fasanella's work, however, remained largely unknown for nearly 30 years. While he was acknowledged within labor and leftist circles, his art remained more of a popular curiosity.

=== Late public acclaim ===
A self-proclaimed folk-art dealer "discovered" Fasanella in 1972.

On October 30, 1972, Fasanella appeared on the cover of New York magazine. The cover depicted him wearing a work shirt and standing in his tiny studio. Accompanying the photo was the headline: "This man pumps gas in the Bronx for a living. He may also be the best primitive painter since Grandma Moses."

The New York magazine cover catapulted Fasanella to national fame.

Fasanella was happy with his fame, but dismissed descriptions of his work as primitive. Fasanella said it was not possible to be primitive in a post-industrial society. Critic John Berger agreed, pointing out Fasanella's left-liberal critique of urban living, "the violence of the daily necessity of the streets .. the way that the density of the working population makes itself felt."

In 1972 he appeared in a major interview, with anchor Patrick Watson, on WNET Channel XIII's groundbreaking newshour The Fifty-First State. This led to the publishers Alfred Knopf and Company, under chief editor Robert Gottlieb, to commission Watson to write the book Fasanella's City, which was richly produced, with superb four-colour reproductions of the artist's work.

Now Fasanella's art began to sell. He appeared on The Dick Cavett Show and CBS News Sunday Morning with Charles Kuralt, and his work appeared in several documentary films (including one about baseball). A large number of exhibits traveled the U.S. His work brought new respect for folk, urban and working-class art, and encouraged the emerging field of labor culture studies.

Fasanella spent three years in Massachusetts in the mid-1970s. He lived in an $18-a-week room at the YMCA while completing 18 canvases. He produced several very large paintings of New England mill towns, three of which depicted the Lawrence textile strike of 1912. He also produced a painting of Julius and Ethel Rosenberg, and violent, blood-red image of the assassination of John F. Kennedy.

In 1986, Ron Carver, a union organizer, founded a non-profit organization called Public Domain to raise money and acquire Fasanella works so that they could be displayed in public rather than private collections. Carver was inspired by Fasanella himself, who declared, "I didn't paint my paintings to hang in some rich guy's living room."

=== Notable public displays ===
Fasanella's 5-foot by 10-foot painting, Lawrence 1912: The Great Strike (also titled Bread and Roses - Lawrence, 1912) was purchased by donations from 15 labor unions and the AFL-CIO. It was loaned to the United States Congress, where it hung for years in the Rayburn Office Building in the hearing room of the House Subcommittee on Labor and Education. Following the 1994 elections, a staffer for the new Republican majority in Congress had the painting removed from the hearing room and returned to the owners. The work now hangs at the Labor Museum and Learning Center in Flint, Michigan.

In 1995, Fasanella's 1950 painting, Subway Riders, was installed in the Fifth Avenue / 53rd Street subway station.

Fasanella's Family Supper is currently on permanent display in the Great Hall at Ellis Island.

=== Reputation and death ===
By the end of his life, many of the causes Fasanella fought for no longer enjoyed public favor or had been lost. Fasanella himself lamented the decline in the relevance of his work. "It's over. What I wanted to do was to paint great big canvases about the spirit we used to have in the movement and then go around the country showing them in union halls. When I started these paintings I had no idea that when they were all finished there wouldn't be any union halls in which to show them."

It quickly became apparent that much of the public fascination for Fasanella's work had relied on the political and socio-economic messages they contained rather than their artistic appeal. As those messages fell from favor, Fasanella was abandoned by many of his strongest supporters. As he told one reporter: "The other day, I called an old lefty pal at 1199 (the drug and hospital workers' union) and offered them my stuff. 'Forget it Ralph,' he said to me. 'We don't want your stuff.'"

At his death, however, he had regained a small measure of popularity. In a press release regarding his death, John Sweeney, president of the AFL-CIO, declared Fasanella to be "a true artist of the people in the tradition of Paul Robeson and Woody Guthrie."

A retrospective at the American Folk Art Museum in 2014 presented critics and the public with an opportunity to reassess Fasanella's art and its place in postwar American culture.

== Critical assessment ==
Critics praise Fasanella for utilizing bold images and strong colors:

His paintings—bold, colorful, loaded with detail yet unified in composition—speak powerfully of a distinct working-class identity and culture, and of the dignity of labor. They capture the past and express hope for the future.

Fasanella is also cited for being able to create deeply detailed works with highly individualized parts, yet unifying these scenes into a coherent single image. "Typically, his paintings have hundreds, if not thousands, of individually painted people and buildings. But Fasanella's people are never individuals. They're always seen en masse."

Some critics have argued that Fasanella's world is one of simplistic nostalgia for a past that never really existed. But his supporters point to the "anger, anxiety and agitation" which can be found not only in some of the subjects he depicts (strikes, sit-ins) but in the subtle details of his canvases (such as the angry marchers in his May Day). "He has done what he set out to do, paint the heroism of the working class in the organizing struggles of the thirties and the forties and the continuing struggles, the joys and sorrows and the hopes that make up the lives of workers and their families."

== Current permanent exhibits ==
Fasanella's paintings may be found in the following permanent collections and public spaces:

- Fifth Avenue / 53rd Street subway station, New York City, NY
- Addison Gallery of American Art, Andover, MA
- Baseball Hall of Fame, Cooperstown, NY
- Communications Workers of America Headquarters Building, Washington, D.C.
- Ellis Island Immigration Museum, Ellis Island, NY
- Flint Public Library, Flint, MI
- Heritage State Park Visitors' Center, Lawrence, MA
- Hirshhorn Museum, Washington, D.C.
- Labor Museum and Learning Center, Flint, MI
- Lewiston/Auburn Campus, University of Southern Maine, Lewiston, ME
- Michigan State University, East Lansing, MI
- Milwaukee Art Museum, Milwaukee, WI
- Smithsonian American Art Museum, Washington, D.C.
- American Folk Art Museum, New York City, NY
- New Bedford City Hall, New Bedford, MA
- New York State Historical Association, Fenimore House Museum, Cooperstown, NY
- Oakland International Airport Terminal Building, Oakland, CA
- State Administration Building, Providence, RI
- Vito Marcantonio Library, Hackensack, NJ (has in its collection 50+ signed Fasanella art prints)
