= 1927–28 American Soccer League =

American Soccer League -1927–28 Season-
- Season: 1927–28
- Champions: Boston
- Lewis Cup: Bethlehem Steel
- Top goalscorer: Andy Stevens (30)

Statistics of American Soccer League in season 1927–28.

== Overview ==
=== New teams ===
During the 1927 off-season, Charles Stoneham bought Indiana Flooring and renamed it the New York Nationals. In order to bring the number of teams back to twelve after the withdrawal of the Springfield Babes and Philadelphia Field Club the previous season, the league admitted the Hartford Americans and Philadelphia Celtic.

=== New format ===
With twelve teams in place, the league made significant changes to its schedule from the previous season. Rather than running a single, 44 game, table for the entire season, the league split the season into two halves, each with its own table. At the end of the season, the top two teams from each half would enter a playoff to determine the league championship.

=== Season ===
The first half of the 1927–28 season began September 10, 1927, and ended on January 8, 1928. Ten games into the season, Philadelphia Celtic withdrew due to financial problems. By this time, the Hartford Americans were also showing financial weakness. Therefore, the league requested Hartford voluntarily withdraw from the league both to strengthen the league's financial position and to create a balanced schedule for the rest of the season. By the end of the first half, Boston had finished at the top of the table, but Bethlehem Steel and New Bedford tied with forty-one points each. This led to an improvised first half playoff game on February 22, 1928, between Bethlehem Steel and New Bedford to determine second place. The second half of the season began on February 4, 1928, and ended on May 30, 1928.

=== Playoffs ===
The structural problems with the proposed playoff system became obvious by the end of the first half of the season. As mentioned above, Bethleham Steel and New Bedford finished tied for second place. This led to a playoff game which, ironically, did not take place until February 22, 1928, nearly two weeks after the second half of the season began. In that game, played in Tiverton, Rhode Island, the Whalers defeated the Steelmen, 2-0. Further complications arose at the end of the second half. When New Bedford and Fall River F.C. finished as the top two teams this led to an unbalanced playoff. The league had intended to have a four team playoff, but the playoff now consisted of three teams – Boston, New Bedford and Fall River. Therefore, the league first decided to allow Bethlehem Steel to enter as the fourth team. This led to a protest by the New York Nationals that they deserved to be the fourth team on account of finishing above Bethlehem Steel in the second half. The league executives decided then to include both the Nationals and Bethlehem Steel, making the playoffs a five-team affair. Bethlehem Steel defeated the Nationals in a two-game series, the first on June 4 and the second on June 6. Three days later, Bethlehem met the Boston Soccer Club in the first game of their semifinal series. The Bethlehem players were clearly fatigued and their goalkeeper, Dave Edwards went down injured as Bethlehem lost. Rather than travel back to their home stadium in Pennsylvania for the second leg of the series, Bethlehem elected to play at Hawthorne Stadium in Brooklyn. This was home to the Brooklyn Wanderers. While there, Bethlehem requested the Wanderers loan their goalkeeper, future Aberdeen great Steve Smith, to replace the injured Edwards. However, Bethlehem Steel failed to notify league officials that Smith would be a guest player. After Bethlehem won the game, 4-0, going through on aggregate, Boston lodged a complaint which the league sustained. The second game was declared void and Boston's first leg victory became the deciding game in the semifinal. In the other semifinal, the New Bedford Whalers defeated Fall River F.C. However, two players from each team were sent off in the second game. Then Sturdy Maxwell, one of the ejected Whalers players got into a post-game fight with Tec White of the 'Marksmen'. The league suspended White and Maxwell, depriving the Whalers of their starting right half. In the final between the Boston Soccer Club and New Bedford Whalers, both teams scored in the first half, but the Whalers clinched the championship with three second half goals by Barney Battles Jr.

== League standings ==
=== First half ===
Place	Team	GP	W	L	D	GF	GA	Pts	Pct
1	Boston	29	18	7	4	65	36	43	.741
2	New Bedford Whalers	29	17	7	5	68	45	41	.706
3	Bethlehem Steel	29	18	5	6	70	49	41	.706
4	Brooklyn Wanderers	29	13	9	7	68	50	35	.603
5	Fall River F.C.	31	14	6	11	75	58	34	.548
6	New York Giants	30	13	6	11	73	57	32	.533
7	Providence	30	9	8	13	47	59	26	.433
8	J & P Coats	32	6	7	19	39	66	19	.297
9	Newark Skeeters	30	7	3	20	46	77	17	.283
10	New York Nationals	30	7	3	20	41	77	17	.283
11	Hartford Americans	11	4	2	5	14	14	10	.454
12	Philadelphia Celtic	10	2	1	7	17	35	5	.222

=== Second half ===
Place	Team	GP	W	L	D	GF	GA	Pts	Pct
1	New Bedford Whalers	25	13	8	4	52	31	34	.680
2	Fall River F.C.	26	15	5	6	55	30	35	.673
3	New York Nationals	24	10	8	6	39	35	28	.583
4	Bethlehem Steel	23	10	6	7	43	31	26	.565
5	Boston	22	19	6	7	41	34	27	.545
6	Providence	26	11	5	10	41	46	27	.519
7	New York Giants	23	11	3	12	53	50	25	.481
8	Brooklyn Wanderers	25	9	3	13	39	52	21	.420
9	J & P Coats	20	3	3	14	30	54	9	.225
10	Newark Skeeters	17	2	1	14	18	46	5	.147

== Playoffs ==
=== First half playoff ===
When Bethlehem Steel and New Bedford finished tied for second place during the first half of the season, this playoff game in February was used to determine the second place team for playoff purposes.

February 22, 1929

New Bedford Whalers	2–0	Bethlehem Steel
Mike McLeavy; McLaughlin

Mark's Stadium, Tiverton, Rhode Island

=== First round ===
June 4, 1928
5:30 PM EST

Bethlehem Steel	2–1	New York Nationals
Archie Stark 1', 46'	Report	44' Hookey Leonard

Lehigh Stadium, Bethlehem, Pennsylvania
Referee: Mose Bloom

June 6, 1928
9:00 PM EST

New York Nationals	0–4	Bethlehem Steel
	Report	75', 77' Archie Stark, Wattie Jackson

Polo Grounds, New York City
Referee: Charles Creighton

Bethlehem Steel advances, 6–1, on aggregate

=== Semifinals ===
==== Seminfinal 1 ====
June 9, 1928

Boston	3–1	Bethlehem Steel
Barney Battles Jr.,, 90'	Report	44' Archie Stark

Referee: Thomas Cunningham

June 12, 1928
6:45 PM EST

Bethlehem Steel	4–0	Boston
Hugh Reid; Archie Stark, Tom Gillespie	Report

Hawthorne Field, Brooklyn, New York

The league voided the result of the second leg game after it was discovered Bethlehem Steel used Steve Smith, the Brooklyn Wanderers goalkeeper, in place of the injured Dave Edwards.

Boston advanced to the final.

==== Seminfinal 2 ====
June 9, 1928

New Bedford Whalers	3–1	Fall River F.C.
Sam Chedgzoy; Bill Paterson; Walter Aspden		Bobby Blair

June 10, 1928

Fall River F.C.	1–0	New Bedford Whalers
Johnny Harvey; Johnny Harvey (red card); Dougie Campbell (red card)		(red card) Red Ballantyne; (red card) Sturdy Maxwell

Mark's Stadium, Tiverton, Rhode Island
Attendance: 4,000
Referee: Thomas Cunningham

New Bedford advanced, 3–2, on aggregate

=== Final ===
June 16, 1928

New Bedford Whalers	2–4	Boston
Nicolas Stewart; Bill Paterson		Johnny Ballantyne,, Barney Battles Jr.

New Bedford, Massachusetts
Referee: R. Bethune

== League Cup ==
The winners of the League Cup final were awarded the H.E. Lewis Cup

=== Bracket ===
March 3–24; 2-legged aggregate
PA	Bethlehem Steel	3	4	7
NJ	Newark Skeeters	1	0	1
MA	Boston	4	4	8
MA	New Bedford Whalers	3	1	4

April 7–8; 2-legged aggregate
PA	Bethlehem Steel	3	2	5
MA	Boston	2	2	4

=== Semifinals ===
March 3, 1928

Bethlehem Steel	3–1	Newark Skeeters
Malcolm Goldie; Archie Stark 58',		Jim Green

I and Tioga, Philadelphia, Pennsylvania
Attendance: 2,000
Referee: Dave Scott

March 4, 1928

Newark Skeeters	0–4	Bethlehem Steel
		37' Archie Stark; 50' Tom Gillespie; 60' Malcolm Goldie; 85' Tom Gillespie

Newark, New Jersey
Attendance: 1,000
Referee: J. Hume

Bethlehem advances, 7–1, on aggregate.

March 18, 1928

New Bedford Whalers	3–4	Boston
Jerry Best, Bill Paterson		Tommy Fleming; Johnny Ballantyne; Jock McIntyre; Werner Nilsen

New Bedford, Massachusetts
Referee: George Lambie

March 24, 1928

Boston	4–1	New Bedford Whalers
Barney Battles Jr., Red Ballantyne; Werner Nilsen		Alec Lorimer

Boston, Massachusetts
Referee: Thomas Cunningham

Boston advances, 8–4, on aggregate.

=== Final ===
April 7, 1928

Bethlehem Steel	3–2 AET	Boston
Archie Stark 15', 92'; Johnny Rollo	Report	22' (pen.) Barney Battles Jr.

I and Tioga, Philadelphia, Pennsylvania
Referee: Charles Creighton

April 8, 1928

Boston	2–2	Bethlehem Steel
Barney Battles Jr. 5', 50'	Report	2' Malcolm Goldie; 23' Archie Stark

Boston, Massachusetts
Referee: Tom Cunningham

Bethlehem wins Lewis Cup, 5–4, on aggregate.

== Goals leaders ==
Rank	Scorer	Club	Games	Goals
1	Andy Stevens	New Bedford Whalers	46	30
2	Max Grünwald	New York Giants	51	29
3	Tom Gillespie	Bethlehem Steel	43	28
4	Arnie Oliver	J&P Coats	44	27
4	Archie Stark	Bethlehem Steel	46	27
6	John Nelson	Fall River F.C.	38	25
6	Davey Brown	New York Giants	47	25
8	Dave McEachran	Boston	47	22
8	Tommy Florie	Providence	50	22
10	Bobby Blair	Fall River F.C.	42	21
10	Tec White	Fall River F.C.	46	21
12	Bill Paterson	New Bedford Whalers	34	20
13	Joseph Gregretsky	Newark Skeeters	29	19
13	Jimmy McConnell	J&P Coats	32	19
13	George Graham	Brooklyn Wanderers	34	19
13	Billy Hogg	New York Giants	34	19
17	Mike McLeavy	New Bedford Whalers	36	17
17	Werner Nilsen	Boston	46	17
17	Bobby Curtis	Brooklyn Wanderers	47	17
20	Harold Brittan	Fall River F.C.	28	16
20	Moritz Häusler	New York Giants	42	16
20	Shamus O'Brien	New York Giants	53	16
23	Barney Battles Jr.	Boston	43	15
23	Jerry Best	New Bedford Whalers	46	15
23	Red Ballantyne	New Bedford Whalers	51	15
23	Billy Adair	Brooklyn Wanderers	54	15
27	József Eisenhoffer	Brooklyn Wanderers	43	14
27	Bobby Walker	New York Nationals	47	14
27	Alex McNab	Boston	50	14
30	Johnny Jaap	Bethlehem Steel	40	13
31	Johnny Ballantyne	Boston	32	12
32	Geordie Henderson	New York Nationals	32	11
33	James McKechnie	New York Nationals	25	10
33	Bart McGhee	New York Nationals	38	10
33	Andy Auld	Providence	44	10
33	Alec Lorimer	New Bedford Whalers	48	10
33	Alec Beattie	Providence	48	10
33	Johnny Harvey	Fall River F.C.	54	10
