= 1926–27 American Soccer League =

American Soccer League -1926–27 Season-
- Season: 1926–27
- Champions: Bethlehem Steel
- Lewis Cup: Boston (2nd title)
- Top goalscorer: Davey Brown (52)

The 1926–27 season was the sixth season of the American Soccer League.

== Rule changes ==
During this season, the American Soccer League introduced two short-lived several rule changes:

- The league introduced goal judges similar to those used in ice hockey.
- A "penalty box" was also introduced, where players were required to serve penalty time standing behind their team’s goal line.

== League standings ==
- The percentage is the percentage of points won of points available, not a win-loss percentage.

Place	Team	GP	W	L	D	GF	GA	Pts	Pct
1	Bethlehem Steel	44	29	8	7	114	52	66	.750
2	Boston	44	25	7	12	90	59	57	.648
3	Fall River F.C.	44	24	8	12	98	72	56	.636
4	New Bedford Whalers	44	24	6	14	124	72	54	.614
5	New York Giants	44	21	7	16	120	102	49	.557
6	Indiana Flooring	44	19	9	15	77	81	47	.547
7	Brooklyn Wanderers	44	18	6	20	83	96	42	.477
8	Providence	43	15	10	18	73	96	40	.466
9	J&P Coats	44	11	14	19	48	72	36	.409
10	Newark Skeeters (Note: Newark forfeited 3 games. Each game was counted as a tie: Bethlehem (1); J&P Coats (1); Providence (1))	38	13	6	25	54	91	32	.363
11	Philadelphia (Note: Philadelphia forfeited 4 games: Boston (2); J&P Coats (1); Providence (1) Those teams each received one point for a tie.)	44	11	4	29	64	123	26	.295
12	Springfield Babes (Note: At the end of December 1926, Springfield withdrew from the league. Its remaining 17 games were counted as forfeits and each team received one point for each forfeited game: Bethlehem (3); Boston (1); Brooklyn (1); Fall River (1); Indiana (2); J&P Coats (3); New Bedford (2); New York (1); Philadelphia (3); Providence (1))	27	7	7	13	44	74	21	.239

== Lewis Cup ==
=== Bracket ===
March 12–13; 2-legged aggregate
MA	Boston	4	4	8
RI	Providence	2	0	0
NY	Brooklyn Wanderers	3	1	4
NY	Indiana Flooring	2	1	3

April 2–3; 2-legged aggregate
MA	Boston	2	3	5
NY	Brooklyn Wanderers	0	0	0

=== Semifinals ===
March 12, 1927

Boston	4–2	Providence
Barney Battles, Jr., Alex McNab; Johnny Ballantyne		Denis Lawson; Jimmy McConnell

Boston, Massachusetts
Referee: Mose Bloom

March 13, 1927

Providence	0–4	Boston

Referee: Mose Bloom

Boston advanced, 8–2, on aggregate.

March 12, 1927

Indiana Flooring	2–3	Brooklyn Wanderers
Red McMillan 15' (o.g.); Hookey Leonard 30'		45' Bobby Yule; József Eisenhoffer; 85' Sándor Nemes

Boston, Massachusetts
Referee: George Lambie

March 13, 1927
3:00 PM EST

Brooklyn Wanderers	1–1	Indiana Flooring
Bobby Yule 73'		35' Bob Millar

Hawthorne Field, Brooklyn, New York
Attendance: 10,000
Referee: George Lambie

Brooklyn advanced, 4–3, on aggregate.

=== Final ===
April 2, 1927

Boston	2–0	Brooklyn Wanderers
Tommy Flemming 2'; Werner Nilsen 72'

Boston, Massachusetts
Referee: James Walder

April 3, 1927
3:00 PM EST

Brooklyn Wanderers	0–3	Boston
		8' Bobby Blair; 25', 88' Werner Nilsen

Hawthorne Field, Brooklyn, New York
Attendance: 8,000
Referee: James Walder

Boston wins Lewis Cup, 5–0, on aggregate.

== Goals leaders ==
Rank	Scorer	Club	Games	Goals
1	Davey Brown	New York Giants	38	52
2	Bobby Blair	Boston Soccer Club	38	38
3	Andy Stevens	New Bedford Whalers	36	36
4	Tom Gillespie	Bethlehem Steel	32	33
5	Bill Paterson	New Bedford Whalers	27	30
6	John Nelson	Brooklyn Wanderers	35	27
7	Archie Stark	Bethlehem Steel	29	23
7	Tommy White	Newark Skeeters	31	23
9	Robert Rock	Philadelphia Field Club	30	21
9	Ed McLaine	Providence	32	21
11	Mike McLeavy	New Bedford Whalers	30	20
11	Dougie Campbell	Fall River F.C.	41	20
13	Jimmy McConnell	Providence	21	17
13	Jerry Best	New Bedford Whalers	35	17
13	Max Grünwald	New York Giants	37	17
16	Johnny Ballantyne	Boston Soccer Club	39	16
16	Tec White	Fall River F.C.	39	16
18	József Eisenhoffer	Brooklyn Wanderers	39	15
19	Bob Millar	Indiana Flooring	29	14
19	Neil Turner	New Bedford Whalers	32	14
19	Johnny Jaap	Bethlehem Steel	35	14
19	Sturdy Maxwell	New Bedford Whalers	36	14
23	Herbert Carlsson	Indiana Flooring	34	13
23	Moritz Häusler	New York Giants	36	13
25	Sam Kennedy	Fall River F.C.	25	12
25	George Forrest	Bethlehem Steel	29	12
25	Bart McGhee	Indiana Flooring	36	12
28	Jimmy McClure	Philadelphia	32	11
29	Viktor Hierländer	New York Giants	21	10
29	Bob Campbell	Springfield Babes	22	10
29	Dave McEachran	Fall River F.C.	34	10
29	Malcolm Goldie	Bethlehem Steel	37	10
29	Werner Nilsen	Boston Soccer Club	40	10
29	Jimmy Montgomerie	New Bedford Whalers	42	10
