= Jack Green =

Jack Green may refer to:

== Sportsmen ==
- Jack Green (cricketer) (1921–2005), Australian cricketer
- Jack Green (footballer, born 1887) (1887–1963), Australian rules footballer for Geelong and Collingwood
- Jack Green (footballer, born 1905) (1905–1960), Australian rules footballer for Carlton and Hawthorn
- Jack Green (footballer, born 1919) (1919–1981), Australian rules footballer for Collingwood
- Jack Green (footballer, born 1947), Australian rules footballer for Collingwood
- John Green (guard) (1924–1981), American football player and coach known as "Jack"
- Jack Green (hurdler) (born 1991), British 400 m hurdler
- Jack Green (soccer) (died 1960), English-Canadian soccer inside forward

== Others ==
- Jack Green (artist) (born 1953), Australian artist and environmental campaigner
- Jack Green (geologist) (1925–2014), geologist and geology professor
- Jack Green (karateka), former British karate champion
- Jack Green (musician) (1951–2024), Scottish musician
- Jack N. Green (born 1946), American cinematographer
- jack green, pen name of American literary critic Christopher Carlisle Reid (born 1928)

== See also ==
- Jack Greene (1930–2013), American country musician
- Jack P. Greene (born 1931), American historian
- John Green (disambiguation)
- Jake Green (disambiguation)
- Jack in the green, a participant in traditional English May Day parades
- Jackgreen, Australian green energy company
