= Aspden (disambiguation) =

Aspden may refer to:

- Aspden, the historic name of a valley in Lancashire, England.
- Dave Aspden, the 45th mayor of Barrie, Ontario, from 2006 to 2010.
- Gary Aspden (born 1969), English consultant
- Hannah Aspden (born 2000), American Paralympic swimmer
- Ray Aspden (1938–2021), an English former professional footballer.
- Ruth Spencer Aspden, a British artist
- Suzanne Aspden, professor of music at Jesus College, University of Oxford.
- Tommy Aspden (1880–1959), an English professional footballer.
- Walter Aspden, an American soccer inside forward.

== See also ==
- Aspdin
