= 1928–29 American Soccer League =

American Soccer League -1928–29 Season-
- Season: 1928–29
- Teams: 12
- Champions: Fall River F.C. (4th title)
- Lewis Cup: New York Nationals
- Top goalscorer: Werner Nilsen (30) & János Nehadoma

Statistics of American Soccer League in season 1928–29.

== Overview ==
The first half of the 1928–29 season began on September 1, 1928. This season saw the onset of the Soccer War., a struggle between the American Soccer League and the United States Football Association for control of the sport. It began when the league boycotted the National Challenge Cup in September 1928. Within a week, three ASL teams, Bethlehem Steel, Newark Skeeters and New York Giants, defied the boycott and entered the cup. On September 24, 1928, Bill Cunningham, president of the American Soccer League, suspended the three teams and fined them each $1000.00. In response, the USFA helped create a competing league, the Eastern Professional Soccer League which included the three teams suspended by the ASL, as well as teams from the Southern New York Soccer Association and the newly created New York Hakoah. In a bizarre twist, the first half of the season ended for some teams as early as December 25, 1928, and for others as late as January 13, 1929. The second half of the season then began on December 29, 1928, for some team and for other, not until January 5 or January 13, 1929. This created a situation in which some teams were still playing first half games while other teams were playing their second half games.

In December 1928, the league admitted Jersey City as the league's ninth team for the second season. Jersey City made it seven games into the second half before withdrawing from the league and disbanding. Then on March 23, 1929, J&P Coats also withdrew from the league following its victory over Brooklyn that day. The team came under new ownership which renamed it the Pawtucket Rangers and re-entered the league, taking J&P Coats' record and position in the standings. The team played its first game, a 2–1 loss to Fall River on March 30, 1929. The league had one last team withdrew when the New Bedford Whalers left the league and jumped to the Eastern Professional Soccer League after its 4–0 victory over Boston on March 17, 1929. The Fall River Football Club topped the standings in both the first and second half of the season and were declared league champion.

== League standings ==
- Percentage is a percentage of games won to games played.

=== First half ===
Place	Team	GP	W	L	D	GF	GA	Pts	Pct
1	Fall River F.C.	31	17	9	5	64	36	43	.694
2	Brooklyn Wanderers	31	18	6	7	79	61	42	.677
3	New York Nationals	29	13	8	8	70	53	34	.586
4	Providence	24	13	5	11	53	44	31	.534
5	New Bedford Whalers	29	11	6	12	51	47	28	.483
6	Boston	28	8	8	12	49	60	24	.429
7	Philadelphia	18	3	6	9	27	40	12	.333
8	J&P Coats	28	4	7	17	28	69	15	.268
9	New York Giants	8	3	2	3	15	17	8	.500
10	Bethlehem Steel	6	3	0	3	12	8	6	.500
11	Newark Skeeters	7	0	1	6	7	30	0	.000

=== Second half ===
Place	Team	GP	W	L	D	GF	GA	Pts	Pct
1	Fall River F.C.	22	11	6	5	38	24	28	.636
2	Providence	22	12	3	7	46	37	27	.614
3	J&P Coats / Pawtucket Rangers (Note: Team played 18 games as J&P Coats and 7 games as the Pawtucket Rangers.)	25	13	2	10	42	39	28	.560
4	New York Nationals	21	8	7	6	68	55	23	.548
5	Brooklyn Wanderers	20	5	6	9	42	50	18	.536
6	Philadelphia	18	6	3	9	36	54	15	.450
7	Boston	25	7	4	14	45	55	18	.417
8	New Bedford Whalers (Note: Withdrew from the ASL after March 17, 1929, and entered the Eastern Professional Soccer League.)	14	7	1	6	37	28	15	.360
9	Jersey City (Note: Withdrew following February 10, 1929, loss to Providence.)	7	2	0	5	11	23	4	.286

== League Cup ==
The winners of the League Cup final were awarded the H.E. Lewis Cup. The finalist were tied on aggregate goals (4 each) after their two match series, and so were required to play a third winner take all match at a neutral site, Hawthorne Field in Brooklyn.

=== Bracket ===
January 5–20; 2-legged aggregate
MA	New Bedford Whalers	1	3	4
MA	Fall River F.C.	1	2	2
NY	New York Nationals	5	3	8
NY	Brooklyn Wanderers	5	2	7

January 26 - February 3; 2-legged aggregate & *match replay
MA	New Bedford Whalers	3	1(2)	6
NY	New York Nationals	2	2(4)	8

=== Semifinals ===
January 5, 1929

New Bedford Whalers	1–1	Fall River F.C.
Mike McLeavy 9'		79' Alex McNab

New Bedford, Massachusetts
Referee: A. White

January 6, 1929

Fall River F.C.	2–3	New Bedford Whalers
Tec White; Bert Patenaude; Denis Doyle 79' (o.g.)		Sam Kennedy; 80' Sam Chedgzoy

Mark's Stadium, Tiverton, Rhode Island
Referee: R. Bethune

New Bedford advances, 4–3, on aggregate.

January 19, 1929

New York Nationals	5–5	Brooklyn Wanderers
Hookey Leonard; Bart McGhee; Jimmy Gallagher; John Nelson,		Bobby Curtis,,, János Nehadoma

The Polo Ground, New York, New York

January 20, 1929

Brooklyn Wanderers	2–3	New York Nationals
Frank Toner 48', 53'		27', 33', 43' John Nelson

Hawthorne Field, Brooklyn, New York
Attendance: 5,000
Referee: James Walder

New York advances, 8–7, on aggregate.

=== Final ===
January 26, 1929

New Bedford Whalers	3–2	New York Nationals
Sam Chedgzoy 10'; Mike McLeavy 30'; Jimmy Howieson 82'	Report	43', John Nelson

New Bedford, Massachusetts
Attendance: 5,000

January 27, 1929

New York Nationals	2–1	New Bedford Whalers
Hookey Leonard 55', 89'	Report 1 Report 2 Report 3	5' Sam Kennedy

The Polo Grounds, New York, New York
Attendance: 3,000
Referee: Thomas Cunningham

February 3, 1929
2:30 PM

New York Nationals	4–2	New Bedford Whalers
Jimmy Gallagher 56', 73', 79'; John Nelson 61'	Report	46' Sam Chedgzoy; 75' Sam Kennedy

Hawthorne Field, Brooklyn, New York
Attendance: 4,000
Referee: Thomas Cunningham

New York wins Lewis Cup, 8–6, on aggregate.

== Goals leaders ==
Rank	Scorer	Club	Games	Goals
1	Janos Nehadoma	Brooklyn Wanderers	48	43
1	Werner Nilsen	Boston	53	43
3	John Nelson	J&P Coats	43	39
4	Bill Paterson	Providence	35	33
5	Hookey Leonard	New York Nationals	50	31
6	Sam Kennedy	J&P Coats	37	23
7	Freddie Wall	Philadelphia	23	22
7	Tec White	Fall River F.C.	49	22
9	Bart McGhee	New York Nationals	30	19
10	Herbert Carlsson	New York Nationals	45	18
11	Leslie Lyell	Brooklyn Wanderers	45	17
12	Billy Adair	Brooklyn Wanderers	43	16
12	Bert Patenaude	Philadelphia	28	16
14	David Robertson	Brooklyn Wanderers	38	15
15	Jerry Best	New Bedford Whalers	30	14
15	Jack Green	Providence	37	14
17	Jim Purvis	Philadelphia	29	13
18	Bobby Curtis	Brooklyn Wanderers	41	12
19	Nils Nygren	Boston	29	11
19	Mike McLeavy	Providence	31	11
19	Pete Fitzpatrick	New York Giants	43	11
22	Billy Gonsalves	Boston	32	10
