= James McClure =

James McClure may refer to:

- James G. K. McClure (1848-1932), American Presbyterian minister, author, and educator
- James H. McClure (1939–2006), British crime author and journalist, born in South Africa
- Jim McClure (politician) (1924–2011), U.S. senator from Idaho
- James McClure (Unionist politician) (1926–2014), Northern Ireland politician
- James Focht McClure Jr. (1931–2010), U.S. federal judge
- James McClure (table tennis) (1916–2005), American table tennis player
- James Howe McClure (1851–1909), Scottish rugby football player
- James Warren McClure (1919–2004), newspaper executive and publisher
- Jimmy McClure (fl. 1920s), soccer player in the United States

== See also ==
- James McLure (1951–2011), American playwright
