= 1927–28 in American soccer =

Soccer in the United States
- Season: 1927-28

The 1927–28 season was the 16th season of competitive soccer under the United States Soccer Federation.

== National team ==
=== Men's ===
Matches played between July 1927 and June 1928.

May 29, 1928 Olympics R1	Argentina	11–2	United States	Amsterdam, Netherlands
19:00	Ferreira 9', 29'; Tarasconi 24', 63', 66', 89'; Orsi 41', 73'; Cherro 47', 49', 57'	Report	Kuntner 55'; Caroll 75'	Stadium: Olympic Stadium; Attendance: 3,848; Referee: Paul Rouff (Switzerland)

June 10, 1928 Friendly	Poland	3–3	United States	Warsaw, Poland

== League tables ==
=== First half ===
Place	Team	GP	W	L	D	GF	GA	Points	Percentage
1	Boston	29	18	7	4	65	36	43	.741
2	New Bedford Whalers	29	17	7	5	68	45	41	.706
3	Bethlehem Steel	29	18	5	6	70	49	41	.706
4	Brooklyn Wanderers	29	13	9	7	68	50	35	.603
5	Fall River F.C.	31	14	6	11	75	58	34	.548
6	New York Giants	30	13	6	11	73	57	32	.533
7	Providence	30	9	8	13	47	59	26	.433
8	J & P Coats	32	6	7	19	39	66	19	.297
9	Newark Skeeters	30	7	3	20	46	77	17	.283
10	New York Nationals	30	7	3	20	41	77	17	.283
11	Hartford Americans	11	4	2	5	14	14	10	.454
12	Philadelphia Celtic	10	2	1	7	17	35	5	.222

=== Second half ===
Place	Team	GP	W	L	D	GF	GA	Points	Percentage
1	New Bedford Whalers	25	13	8	4	52	31	34	.680
2	Fall River F.C.	26	15	5	6	55	30	35	.673
3	New York Nationals	24	10	8	6	39	35	28	.583
4	Bethlehem Steel	23	10	6	7	43	31	26	.565
5	Boston	22	19	6	7	41	34	27	.545
6	Providence	26	11	5	10	41	46	27	.519
7	New York Giants	23	11	3	12	53	50	25	.481
8	Brooklyn Wanderers	25	9	3	13	39	52	21	.420
9	J & P Coats	20	3	3	14	30	54	9	.225
10	Newark Skeeters	17	2	1	14	18	46	5	.147

=== St. Louis Soccer League ===
Place	Team	GP	W	L	T	GF	GA	Points
1	Tablers	14	8	3	3	42	31	19
2	Wellstone	14	5	6	3	27	28	13
3	Ben Millers	14	5	7	2	28	35	12
4	Morgan Haulers	14	3	5	6	22	25	12

== ASL League Cup ==
Semifinals
PA	Bethlehem Steel	3-4
NJ	Newark Skeeters	1-0
MA	Boston	4-4
MA	New Bedford Whalers	3-1

Finals
PA	Bethlehem Steel	3-2
MA	Boston	2-2
