= 1927 National Challenge Cup =

- Dewar Challenge Cup

Tournament details
- Country: United States
- Dates: 20 February 1927 – 1 May 1927

Final positions
- Champions: Fall River F.C. (2nd title)
- Runners-up: Holley Carburetor
- Semifinalists: Sparta ABA; Bethlehem Steel

The 1927 National Challenge Cup was the annual open cup held by the United States Football Association now known as the Lamar Hunt U.S. Open Cup.

== Eastern Division ==
First round
March 27 - Tiverton
Fall River F.C.	3
New Bedford Whalers	2
March 26 - Boston
Boston Soccer Club	2
Fore River	3
March 27/April 2
Providence FC	3-3
J&P Coats	3-2
March 27 - Buffalo
Hungarian F.C.	0
Whittal F.C.	5
March 27 - New York
Indiana Flooring	3
New York Giants	1
March 19 - Brooklyn
Brooklyn Wanderers	1
Newark Skeeters	2
March 27 - Trenton
Trenton F.C.	2
Viking F.C.	1
March 26 - Philadelphia
Philadelphia Field Club	1
Bethlehem Steel	3

Second round
April 3 - Tiverton
Fall River F.C.	5
Fore River	0
April 9 - Providence
Providence FC	7
Whittal F.C.	1
April 9 - New York
Indiana Flooring	1
Newark Skeeters	2
April 3 - Trenton
Trenton F.C.	0
Bethlehem Steel	6

Semi-finals
April 17 - Tiverton
Fall River F.C.	3
Providence FC	2
April 10 - Brooklyn
Newark Skeeters	0
Bethlehem Steel	1

Final
April 24 - Providence
Fall River F.C.	2
Bethlehem Steel	1

== Western Division ==
First round
February 20 - St. Louis
Ben Millers	5
Pants Store F.C.	4
February 27 - St. Louis
Wellston	9
Johnston City AFC	1
February 27 - Chicago
Sparta ABA	3
Thistles F.C.	0
February 27 - Chicago
Bricklayers	2
White Banner Malt	0
February 27 - Detroit
Holley Carburetor	2
Canadian Club	1
February 27- Chicago
Pullman F.C.	0
Buda AA	4
February 27 - Cleveland
American-Hungarians	3
Magyar-American F.C.	2
February 27- Wooster
Clan MacKenzie	4
Lorain Eagles	0

Second round
March 13 - St. Louis
Ben Millers	4
Wellston	2
March 20 - Chicago
Sparta ABA	2
Bricklayers	1
March 20 - Detroit
Holley Carburetor	3
Buda AA	2
March 27 - Cleveland
American-Hungarians	5
Clan MacKenzie	0

Semi-finals
April 3, 10
Ben Millers	2-0
Sparta ABA	2-1
April 3 - Detroit
Holley Carburetor	4
American-Hungarians	2

Final
April 18 - Chicago
Sparta ABA	1
Holley Carburetor	2

== Final ==
May 1, 1927

Holley Carburetor (MI)	0–7 (0–2)	Fall River F.C. (MA)
	Report	White (2 goals); McEachran (2 goals); Campbell; Brittan; Kelly

University of Detroit Stadium, Detroit, Michigan
Attendance: 10,000
Referee: Charles Creighton (NY / USA)
Linesmen: D. Evans, W. Ferguson

=== Lineups ===
The finalists played as follows:

Holley		Fall River
Dick	G	Tom Blair
Boath	LB	Dave Gibson
Hayston	RB	Charlie McGill
Stewart	LHB	Hugh Coyle
Dalrymple	CHB	Bob Wilson
Gallagher	RHB	Bill McPherson
Love	OL	Dave McEachran
Rutherford	IL	Jimmy Kelly
Gerrit Visser	CF	Harold Brittan (C)
Connally (C)	IR	James "Tec" White
Forrester	OR	Dougie Campbell

== Sources ==
- Jose, Colin (1998). American Soccer League, 1921-1931 (Hardback). The Scarecrow Press. (ISBN 0-8108-3429-4).
