= Bob Wilson (footballer, born September 1898) =

Scottish footballer

Personal information
- Full name: Robert Scott Wilson
- Date of birth: 25 September 1898
- Place of birth: Bellshill, Scotland
- Height: 5 ft 10 in (1.78 m)
- Positions: Centre half; centre forward

Senior career*
Years	Team	Apps	(Gls)
- Cambuslang Rangers
1921–1924	Third Lanark	40	(2)
1924–1925	Bradford (Park Avenue)		(25)
1925–1926	Shawsheen Indians	20	(3)
1926–1928	Fall River	74	(4)
1928	Bethlehem Steel	1	(0)
1928–1929	Pawtucket Rangers	8	(3)
- * Club domestic league appearances and goals

Robert Scott Wilson (born 25 September 1898) was a Scottish footballer who played as a centre half.

== Career ==
Born and raised in Bellshill, he began his senior career with Third Lanark, making 30 Scottish Football League appearances in the 1922–23 Scottish Division One season. In the summer of 1923 he took part in the club's tour of South America and three months later featured on the losing side in the final of the Glasgow Cup; however, he made only four league appearances that season and moved on to Bradford (Park Avenue) in England, where he underwent a positional change and became a centre forward, succeeding in the role to the extent that he finished the club's leading scorer for the campaign with 25 goals in the Football League Third Division North.

In late 1925 Wilson moved to the United States and the American Soccer League, reverting to a more defensive position and initially featuring not for the Fall River as had been rumoured, but for newcomers the Shawsheen Indians before switching to the 'Marksmen' in time to play a part in their 1925–26 American Soccer League title-winning campaign. He remained with Fall River for two further seasons, winning the 1927 National Challenge Cup with a 7–0 win over Holley Carburetor lining up alongside several other Scots including another former Third Lanark player Charlie McGill. After a single trial appearance in the ASL for Bethlehem Steel, Wilson transferred to the Pawtucket Rangers (also known as J. & P. Coats) for the 1928–29 season which was his last in the league. It is believed that he remained in the United States after his playing career, settling in California.
