= Jimmy Kelly (Northern Ireland footballer) =

Northern Ireland footballer

Personal information
- Full name: James Kelly
- Position: Inside forward

Senior career*
Years	Team	Apps	(Gls)
–1922	Bangor		
1922–????	St Johnstone		
- Toronto Ulster
1926–1928	Fall River	67	(15)
- * Club domestic league appearances and goals

Jimmy Kelly was an early twentieth-century Irish football inside forward who played professionally in Northern Ireland, Scotland, Canada and the United States.

== Career ==
Kelly played for Northern Ireland club Bangor F.C. of the now defunct Intermediate League, but was transferred to St Johnstone F.C. of the Scottish Football League in 1922. At some point, he left Britain for Canada where he played for Toronto Ulster. In 1926, he moved south to sign with the Fall River of the American Soccer League. In 1927, Kelly scored one of Fall River's seven goals in their romp over Holley Carburetor F.C. in the 1927 National Challenge Cup final. In 1928, he left the ASL.
