= Nicolas Stewart =

Scottish footballer

Personal information
- Place of birth: Scotland

Senior career*
Years	Team	Apps	(Gls)
- Shettleston Juniors
- Maryhill Hibs
- Kirkintilloch Rob Roy
1926	Springfield Babes	16	(1)
1926–1927	New Bedford Whalers	2	(0)
1927	Hartford Americans	3	(0)
1927–1930	New Bedford Whalers	79	(3)
1928	→ Brooklyn Wanderers (loan)	1	(0)
1929	→ Newark Skeeters (loan)	3	(0)
1930–????	Alloa Athletic		
- * Club domestic league appearances and goals

Nicolas Stewart was a Scottish footballer who played in Scotland and the American Soccer League.

Stewart played for several teams in the Scottish Junior Football League including Shettleston Juniors, Maryhill Hibs F.C. and Kirkintilloch Rob Roy F.C. In 1926, he signed with the Springfield Babes of the American Soccer League. The Babes withdrew from the league just after Christmas 1926 and Stewart moved to the New Bedford Whalers for the rest of the season. In 1927, Stewart joined the Hartford Americans. Like the Babes, the Americans withdrew from the league early in the season and Stewart again moved to the Whalers. He remained with the Whalers except for loans to Brooklyn Wanderers and Newark Skeeters. In July 1930, he returned to Scotland where he joined Alloa Athletic
