= Robert Gregg =

Robert or Bob Gregg may refer to:

- Robert Gregg (bishop) (1834–1897), Anglican archbishop
- Bob Gregg (footballer, born 1904) (1904–1991), English football player
- Bob Gregg (footballer, born 1899) (1899–1955), Scottish football player
- Robert Gregg (field hockey) (born 1954), American Olympic hockey player
- Robert D. Gregg, American bioengineer, roboticist and inventor
- Robert John Gregg (1912–1998), linguist
- Bobby Gregg (1936–2014), American musician
- Clark Gregg (Robert Clark Gregg Jr., born 1962), American actor, director, and screenwriter
- Rob Gregg, Canadian curler see 2013 Stu Sells Oakville Tankard

== See also ==
- Sir Robert Greg (1876–1953), British diplomat
- Robert Hyde Greg (1795–1875), British industrialist and MP
