= Bobby Blair =

Bobby Blair may refer to:

- Bobby Blair (footballer), Scottish footballer
- Bobby Blair (tennis) (born 1964), American tennis player
