= Clem Cuthbert =

Scottish-American soccer player

Personal information
- Place of birth: Scotland
- Position: Forward

Senior career*
Years	Team	Apps	(Gls)
- Chicago Bricklayers
- Chicago Manhattan Beer
- * Club domestic league appearances and goals

Clem Cuthbert was a Scottish-American soccer player who spent his career in the Chicago leagues.

Cuthbert may have played in Clyde before moving to the United States and settling in Chicago. By 1924, he was playing for Chicago Bricklayers. In 1928, Cuthbert scored the lone Bricklayers goal as they fell to the New York Nationals in the final of the 1928 National Challenge Cup. Three years later, he again scored as Bricklayers finished runner up to the Fall River F.C. in the 1931 National Challenge Cup final. On June 15, 1930, Cuthbert played on loan to Chicago Sparta during an exhibition game against Rangers F.C. In 1934, the Bricklayers became the Wiebold Wonderbolts. Cuthbert continued to play for them into the late 1930s. At some point, he moved to Chicago Manhattan Beer. During the 1938–1939 season, Manhattan Beer competed in the St. Louis Soccer League. In 1939, Cuthbert again experienced disappointment when Manhattan Beer fell to Brooklyn St. Mary's Celtic in the final of the 1939 National Challenge Cup.
