= American Soccer Association Cup =

The American Soccer Association Cup was an open cup-tie competition that took place in 1929. The entries for this tournament were the ASL teams and amateur clubs from the Southern New York State Association. The amateur clubs played the early rounds to earn the right to play off against the ASL entrants in the final stages. The tournament ran from February to May. The sixth round which constituted the tournament proper included the seven ASL teams and the only amateur side to qualify, the Brooklyn Celtics. The final was played over two legs with Providence gaining the title over the New York Nationals with a 4-2 win on May 20 after the teams drew 2-2 on May 18. A May 19 game was played but officials called the game on account of weather and continued as an exhibition match with the teams playing to a 4-4 draw. This tournament was not continued as the 'Soccer War' was later resolved.

== First round ==
February 1929

Norwegian	5-2	Clan Campbell

Referee:

February 1929

First Germans	5-2	Danish A.C.

Referee:

== Second round ==
February 24, 1929
3:30PM

Swedish	3-10	Galicia

Commercial Field, Brooklyn

February 24, 1929

Trumpeldor	6–0	Klippen
Laszlo(4); Solomon(2)

Hawthorne Field

March 3, 1929
2:30pm

Norwegian	5-1	Brooklyn Americans
Bakken(2 pk); Casper; Alf Olsen; Petterøe		10'

Ulmer Park

March 3, 1929

German Hungarians	0-3	First German

Brooklyn

March 3, 1929

Yonkers St.George	0–1	Otis Elevator
		10' Pete Joslip

Glen Park

March 3, 1929

Yonkers Thistle	6–3	New Rochelle
Walker; Stewart(2); Lees(2); Heineman

Ludlow Dock

March 3, 1929

Danersk	0–4	Port Chester

Cummings Park

March 3, 1929

Nassau	3–0	Mineola
F.Kelly; Glasgow; Carr

Neighborhood Field
Referee: Hugh Evans

March 10, 1929

Greenwich	3–5	Stamford
?',55' Scott(2); Hendrie		McMillan(3); Cunningham; McLelland

Havemeyer Field
Referee: William Halliday

March 10, 1929

Brooklyn Celtics	7-0	Gjoa

March 17, 1929
1:30PM

Davis Mills	9-3	Friars
Humphries (4); Golz (2); Beaulieu (2); Croteau		Bouffard; Braga

Mark Stadium, Tiverton, RI
Referee: Scholes

March 17, 1929
3:00 PM

Hose Ten	3-2	Butlers
White (2); La Rue		Boule; Waring

Mark Stadium, Tiverton, RI
Referee: Fonseca

March 17, 1929
2:00 PM

New Bedford Juniors	1-5	Picards
Connick		15' L. Varnesse; Jackson; McGrady (3)

Battery Park, New Bedford, MA
Referee: Norse

== Third round ==
March 10, 1929

Yonkers Thistle	3-2	Otis Elevator
Adams; Jock Stewart; 80' Jock Stewart		Leadbetter; Nichol

Glen Park

March 17, 1929

Port Chester	0-2	Stamford
		McMillan; 88' McMillan

Washington Park
Referee: W.Halliday

March 17, 1929

Norwegian	5–1	Trumpeldors

March 17, 1929
3:00PM

Galicia	1–1	Nassau
Bruce(pk)		Carr

East NY Oval
Referee: O'Halloran

March 17, 1929

First German	1–1	Brooklyn Celtic
Machle		Glenn

Suydam Oval

March 17, 1929

Nassau	1–2	Galicia
Fleming		Vega; Doyle

Glen Cove, L.I.
Attendance: 400

March 24, 1929

Brooklyn Celtic	3–0	First German
Hughes; Adams

Todd Field

April 14, 1929

Davis Mills	3-2	Picards
J.Eckersley (2); Beaulieu		Remiliard (2)

Referee: Lovett

== Fourth round ==
April 13, 1929

Brooklyn Wanderers	5–2	Norwegians
10' Nehadoma(Pearce); 20' Curtis; 67' Hogg(Mitchell); Brown(pk); Pearce(Hogg)		55' Fass; Backen(pk)

Hawthorne Field
Referee: T.Dempsey

April 19, 1929
11:00AM

Davis Mills	1-0	Hose Tens
George Bradbury

Mark Stadium, Tiverton, RI
Referee: Lovett

== Fifth round ==
April 7, 1929
3:30PM

Galicia	2–2	Philadelphia
Bruce; Ozores		65' Wall; 80' McKenna

Hawthorne Field
Referee: Dempsey
Attendance: 1000

April 13, 1929
3:00PM

Philadelphia	6–2	Galicia
Wall(4); Purvis; Moore		Ozores; Boyle

Northeast High School
Referee: Hayes

April 20, 1929
2:30PM

Brooklyn Wanderers	5–1	Stamford
Mitchell; 15' Nehadoma(Curtis); Nehadoma(McMillan); 55' Nehadoma(Hogg); 75' Curtis		8' Calder(pk)

Polo Grounds
Attendance: 1500
Referee: C.Stott

April 20, 1929
4:30PM

New York Nationals	10–1	Yonkers Thistle
10' John Nelson(Carlson); 11' John Nelson(Leonard); 16' Gallagher; John Nelson(Gallagher); Carlson; Gallagher; 50' McGhee(Leonard); Carlson; Leonard; McGhee		Torrance(Knox)

Polo Grounds
Attendance: 1500
Referee: H.Evans

April 21, 1929
1:30PM

Davis Mills	3–5	Pawtucket
60' Golz; Beaulieu; 68' Bradbury		Sam Kennedy(4); Jim McAuley

Mark Stadium, Tiverton, RI
Referee: Lovett

== Quarterfinals ==
April 27, 1929

Pawtucket	1–1	Providence
Kennedy		Paterson

Coats Field
Referee: George Lambie

April 28, 1929

Providence	6–0	Pawtucket
Paterson (3); Hogg (2); Watson

Cycledrome
Referee: George Lambie

April 27, 1929

Boston	4–2	Fall River F.C.
Nilsen; G.Burness; H.Burness; McEachran		Patenaude; Patenaude

Boston, MA

April 28, 1929

Fall River F.C.	3–3	Boston
Patenaude; Granger		Gonsalves; Gonsalves; McIntyre(og); Nilsen

Tiverton, RI
Referee: Bethune

April 28, 1929

New York Nationals	2–1	Philadelphia
11' Nelson; 89' Worden(pk)		35' Nicol

Hawthorne Field
Attendance: 2000
Referee: Thomas Cunningham

April 28, 1929

Brooklyn Wanderers	3–1	Brooklyn Celtics
22' Curtis; 55' Curtis; 67' Pearce		10' Hughes

Hawthorne Field
Attendance: 2000
Referee: James Walder

== Semifinals ==
May 4, 1929

Boston	2–1	Providence F.C.
Nilsen; 69' McEachran		63' Paterson

Boston, MA
Referee: George Lambie

May 5, 1929

Providence F.C.	1–0	Boston
89' Paterson

Cycledrome
Referee: George Lambie

May 12, 1929

Providence F.C.	2–0	Boston
130' Paterson; 139' Turner

Cycledrome
Attendance: 2500
Referee: George Lambie

May 5, 1929

New York Nationals	2–1	Brooklyn Wanderers
62' Nelson; 80' Nelson		88' Pearce

Hawthorne Field
Attendance: 1500
Referee: James Walder

May 12, 1929

New York Nationals	2–2	Brooklyn Wanderers
10' Nelson; 87' McGhee		30' Nehadoma; 62' Lyell

Hawthorne Field
Attendance: 2000
Referee: James Walder

== Final ==

May 18, 1929

Providence F.C.	2–2	New York Nationals
16', 41' Nelson		15' Paterson; 35' Auld

Providence Cycledrome
Attendance: 5000
Referee: George Lambie

Exhibition

May 19, 1929

New York Nationals	4–4	Providence F.C.
25' Leonard; 1H' Nelson; Gallagher (2)		15' Watson; 1H' Oswald; 2H' Fitzpatrick; 75' Auld

Polo Grounds; New York, New York
Referee: Tom Cunningham

Replay

May 20, 1929
8:10PM

New York Nationals	2–4	Providence F.C.
31', 75' McGhee		35', 55' Paterson (3); 88' Fitzpatrick

Polo Grounds; New York, New York
Referee: Tom Cunningham

== See also ==
- 1929 National Challenge Cup
- 1928–29 American Soccer League
- 1928–29 Eastern Professional Soccer League
