= Bob Gregg (footballer, born 1899) =

Scottish footballer

Personal information
- Full name: Robert Paton Gregg
- Date of birth: 12 July 1899
- Place of birth: Darvel, Scotland
- Date of death: 4 November 1955 (aged 56)
- Place of death: Ipswich, England
- Position: Fullback

Senior career*
Years	Team	Apps	(Gls)
1921–1923	Irvine Meadow		
1923–1924	Kilmarnock		
1924–1925	Galston		
1925–1926	Nithsdale Wanderers		
1926	Galston		
1926–1927	Philadelphia Field Club	29	(0)
1927	New Bedford Whalers	2	(0)
1928	Providence Clamdiggers	2	(0)
1929	Detroit Holley Carburetor		
1929	Chicago Carpenters		
1930–1932	Chicago Bricklayers		
1932–1935	St Louis Stix, Baer and Fuller		
1935–1936	→ St. Louis Central Breweries		
- * Club domestic league appearances and goals

Robert Paton Gregg (12 July 1899 – 4 November 1955) was a Scottish football fullback who played professionally in Scotland, Canada and the United States, including the American Soccer League and St. Louis Soccer League.

== Youth ==
Gregg grew up playing football with an eye to turning professional. World War I intervened before he could do so and he enlisted in the Royal Scots Regiment as a private on 2 March 1917.

== Professional ==
In September 1921, Gregg signed his first professional contract with Irvine Meadow F.C. in the Ayrshire First Division. In August 1923, he transferred to Kilmarnock F.C. in the Scottish Football League. In July 1924, he moved to Galston F.C. and in July 1925 to Nithsdale Wanderers F.C., both of the newly established Third Division. In April 1926, he returned to Galston. He was there for only a month before leaving Scotland.

Gregg arrived in Quebec Canada on 26 May 1926, having signed with Windsor Rovers F.C of Ontario, Canada. Although he normally played as a full-back, on 26 June 1926 he was placed at centre forward for Rovers, scoring four of their goals against Toronto City in a 7–0 win . On 4 July 1926 he played an International match representing Essex County, Canada vs. the visiting English Football Association. By August 1926 Bob had signed with the Philadelphia Field Club of the American Soccer League (ASL). Philadelphia left the league at the end of the 1927 season after failing in the National Challenge cup at the First Round, and Gregg returned to Windsor Rovers where he again played an International match for the Canadian Windsor All Stars vs. the visiting Scottish Football Association on 4 July 1927 at Kelsey Park, Windsor. Bob finished the 1927 season playing a few games for the New Bedford Whalers, U.S. In January 1928, he transferred to Providence Clamdiggers, Rhode Island, U.S., where he played in two games in the 1928 National Challenge Cup, Providence being eliminated in the Second Round. For the remainder of 1928, and into 1929 he was back in Canada, first Captaining the Ontario Border Scots F.C, and later playing for the Walkerville Football Club, also of Windsor, Ontario.

In May 1929 Gregg signed with Holley Carburetor F.C., of Detroit, Michigan, U.S.A., and in September that year moved West to sign with the Carpenters S.C. in Chicago, Illinois. The following year whilst still in Chicago he signed with Bricklayers F.C. He scored a hat-trick in his first game for Bricklayers on 2 November 1930 at De Paul Field, Chicago, Bricklayers defeating Olympias 4–0. Bricklayers went to the final of the 1931 National Challenge Cup, falling to the Fall River Gregg scored the Bricklayers lone goal in its 1–1 tie with Fall River in the second game. Whilst at Bricklayers Bob played his third International on 21 June 1931 against Celtic F.C of Scotland at Cubs Park Chicago. Early 1932, Gregg moved south to sign with Stix, Baer and Fuller F.C. of the St. Louis Soccer League. He finally found a home in St. Louis, spending the next four seasons there. SBF went to the 1932, 1933 and 1934 National Challenge Cups, winning the last two. Of Stix, Baer and Fuller's championship games Gregg played in the finals of the 1932 National Challenge Cup, again earning him a Runners-up medal. However, Gregg was dogged by injuries in 1933 and appeared in the National Challenge Cup run only as far as the Quarter Finals.

By 1934 Gregg's Injuries became critical and he was on the sick list for most of the season, thereby missing his place in the 1934 National Challenge Cup Finals. In 1935, the Stix, Baer and Fuller department store dropped their sponsorship of the team mid-season to be replaced by Central Breweries. As a result, the team was renamed St. Louis Central Breweries F.C. By this time Gregg had returned to the field of play, and substituted for Maurice Kramer at right back in the final game of the 1935 National Challenge Cup, to finish up with his first National Challenge Cup Winners Medal. By 1936, Bob Gregg had left Central Breweries, St. Louis and the United States to return to Scotland. At some point, he moved to England, dying in Ipswich in 1955.

== International games ==
- English F.A Tour 1926. Gregg represented Essex County Ontario against the English Football Association Team in Windsor, Ontario on 12 July 1926.
- Scottish F.A Tour 1927. Gregg (listed as Bob Greig) represented the Windsor Football Club for the Windsor All Stars v. Touring Scottish Football Association at Kelsey Park, Ontario on 4 July 1927.
- Glasgow Celtic North America Tour 1931. Gregg played for Chicago Bricklayers v. Glasgow Celtic at Cubs Park in Chicago, Illinois, on 21 June 1931.
