= Henry Farrell (disambiguation) =

Henry Farrell (1920–2006) was an American novelist and screenwriter.

Henry Farrell may also refer to:

- Henry Farrell (soccer) (1902–1980), American soccer forward
- Henry Farrell (political scientist) (born 1970), political scientist
