= Gerrit Visser =

Dutch footballer

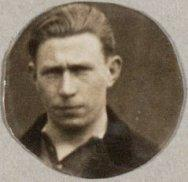

Personal information
- Date of birth: February 2, 1903
- Place of birth: Nieuwendam, Netherlands
- Date of death: December 1984 (aged 81)
- Place of death: Cashmere, Washington, United States
- Position: Center forward

Senior career*
Years	Team	Apps	(Gls)
- Stormvogels
1925–1926	Bethlehem Steel	3	(4)
1927–1931	Holley Carburetor		
- Windsor CNR

International career
1924–1925	Netherlands	7	(1)
- * Club domestic league appearances and goals

Gerrit Visser (2 February 1903 – December 1984) was a Dutch footballer who played as a center forward in the Netherlands, the United States, and Canada. He was a member of the Netherlands football team at the 1924 Summer Olympics, and earned seven caps, scoring one goal, with the Netherlands national football team.

== Professional ==
Visser appears to have begun his professional career in the Netherlands, playing for Stormvogels in 1924. However, at some point, he moved to the United States. In 1925, he signed with Bethlehem Steel of the American Soccer League. He saw no playing time until February 1926 when he replaced the departed Archie Stark at center forward. He then scored four goals in three games. It appears he moved to Windsor, Canada in 1926.

He then moved to Detroit, Michigan where he played for Holley Carburetor from 1927 until 1931. He played in the final of the 1927 National Challenge Cup, losing 0-7 to the Fall River F.C. Early in the second half a penalty shot by him was held by the goalkeeper.

== National team ==
Visser earned seven caps, scoring one goal, with the Netherlands national football team. Four of those games came with the Netherlands Olympic team at the 1924 Summer Olympics.
