= Whittall F.C. =

American amateur soccer team

Whittall Carpet Mills F.C., better known as Whittall F.C., was an early twentieth century U.S. amateur/semi-pro soccer team based in Worcester, Massachusetts.

== History ==
The Whittall soccer club was the company team of Matthew J.Whittall, a British businessman who had established a carpet factory in South Worcester. The team played their games on the Whittall Cricket Field. Drawing largely on a British immigrant population, the factory dominated the town's economy for decades. The team became significantly more competitive beginning in the 1923-24 season when Charles Mapp took over management of the team. Under his leadership the team would win 12 trophies in the next five years. In 1924, Whittall F.C. played in the amateur Central Massachusetts League, moving to the Lawrence Industrial District Soccer League in 1925. That year, they won the league title. Whittall F.C. came to national attention in 1925 when it went to the fourth round of the 1925 National Challenge Cup. They followed that with a second round exit in 1927 and a first round exit in 1928. The 1927-28 season was one of their best where they won every competition they entered save the National Cup. Their record was 17-3-3 scoring 91 goals and receiving 34. Two of their losses were against professional ASL teams and one tie was to Worcestershire of England. In 1930, Whittall once again played the English Worcestershire County Football Association on their tour of the U.S., tying 2-2.

== Honors ==
Lawrence Industrial District League

- Champions: 1925

State Cup

- Champions (2): 1927 Runner-up (2)
- Kiwanis Charity Cup (3)
- State Charity Cup (3)
- Telegram-Gazette Trophy 1928
