= Bobby Walker (footballer, born 1906) =

Scottish footballer (born 1906)

Personal information
- Date of birth: 1906
- Place of birth: Paisley, Scotland
- Position: Outside right

Senior career*
Years	Team	Apps	(Gls)
1924–1927	Kilmarnock	66	(10)
1927	East Stirlingshire		
1927–1928	New York Nationals	60	(16)
1928–1929	J&P Coats	26	(7)
1927–1928	Pawtucket Rangers	5	(1)
- * Club domestic league appearances and goals

Bobby Walker was a Scottish association football outside forward who played in both Scotland and the United States.

In 1927, Walker briefly played for East Stirlingshire F.C. In the autumn of 1927, he signed with the New York Nationals of the American Soccer League. In April 1928, Walker and his teammates won the 1928 National Challenge Cup by defeating Bricklayers and Masons F.C., 4-1 on aggregate. Walker began the 1928-1929 season with the Nationals, but moved to J&P Coats thirteen games into the season. He played for Coats into the 1929 fall season when the team was known as the Pawtucket Rangers.
