= Nils Nygren =

Swedish-American soccer player

Personal information
- Place of birth: Sweden
- Position: Center forward

Senior career*
Years	Team	Apps	(Gls)
- New York Viking
- Woburn Independent
1928–1929	Boston	29	(11)
- * Club domestic league appearances and goals

Nils Nygren was an early twentieth-century Swedish-American soccer center forward who played one season in the American Soccer League.

Nygren played for the amateur New York Viking in the New York State League and Woburn Independent. In 1928, he turned professional with the Boston Soccer Club. Despite finishing nineteenth on the league's scoring list that season, he left professional soccer.
