= Bob Campbell (soccer) =

Scottish-American soccer player

Personal information
- Place of birth: Scotland
- Position: Right half

Senior career*
Years	Team	Apps	(Gls)
- Clan McGregor
1926–1927	Springfield Babes	22	(10)
1927–1930	Providence	147	(4)
- * Club domestic league appearances and goals

Bob Campbell was a Scottish-American soccer right half who spent four seasons in the American Soccer League.

Campbell began his career with the amateur Clan McGregor in the Boston leagues. In 1926, he signed with the Springfield Babes of the American Soccer League. When Springfield withdrew from the league due to financial problems, Campbell moved to Providence for the end of the season. That year he finished twenty-ninth on the league scoring table, his best season statistically. He continued to play for Providence until 1930.
