= Aspdin =

Aspdin is a surname. Notable people with the surname include:

- Joseph Aspdin (1778–1855), English cement manufacturer
- William Aspdin (1815–1864), English cement manufacturer, son of Joseph

== See also ==
- Aspden (disambiguation)
- Aspin (disambiguation)
