= Freddie Wall =

American soccer player

Personal information
- Place of birth: Fall River, Massachusetts, United States
- Position: Forward

Senior career*
Years	Team	Apps	(Gls)
1924–1925	Fall River F.C.	1	(2)
1928–1929	Newark Skeeters	11	(6)
1928–1929	Philadelphia	23	(19)
1929	Brooklyn Wanderers	6	(2)
1929	Boston	2	(0)
1929	New York Nationals	2	(0)
1929	Philadelphia	3	(4)
1929	New York	6	(1)
1929	Newark Skeeters	4	(1)
1930	Newark Portuguese		
- * Club domestic league appearances and goals

Freddie Wall was an American soccer forward who played professionally in the American Soccer League.

In 1924, Wall began his professional career with the Fall River F.C. of the American Soccer League. Although he scored two goals in his lone appearance for the 'Marksmen', he did not return to the ASL until the 1928–1929 season. That year, he signed with the Newark Skeeters. Over the next year, he played for seven teams, appearing in only a handful of games before moving. In 1930, he played for the amateur Newark Portuguese.
