= 1931 National Challenge Cup =

- Dewar Challenge Cup

Tournament details
- Country: United States

Final positions
- Champions: Fall River F.C. (4th title)
- Runners-up: Chicago Bricklayers
- Semifinalists: Ben Millers; Newark Americans

The 1931 National Challenge Cup was the annual open cup held by the United States Football Association now known as the Lamar Hunt U.S. Open Cup.

== History ==
By the spring of 1931, the twin ravages of the Great Depression and the "Soccer Wars" had taken their toll on the American Soccer League. As a result, Sam Mark moved his Fall River F.C. to New York, hoping that a new market there would be more lucrative. Once there he merged the club with New York Soccer Club and renamed them the New York Yankees. Before the merger was finalised, however, Fall River F.C. had entered the National Challenge Cup and Mark was unable to re-register them as the Yankees. As a result, the Spring 1931 season saw them continue to play in the Challenge Cup as the Fall River F.C. while at the same time playing as the New York Yankees in the ASL. While the Yankees only managed to finish third in the ASL, the Marksmen won the cup. Largely on the goalscoring strength of Billy Gonsalves, with 9, and Bert Patenaude, with 13, they reached the final where they eventually beat Chicago Bricklayers in a final played as a three-game series. The last of these three games is officially regarded as the last game the 'Marksmen' ever played. The first leg of the final was played on April 5 at the Polo Grounds, where the 'Marksmen' won 6–2, and seemingly established a clear lead. Patenaude scored five goals in that game while Bill McPherson added the other. A week later at Mills Stadium in Chicago, the Bricklayers kept the series alive by earning a 1–1 draw. This time Gonsalves got on the score sheet. Sparta Stadium in Chicago attracted 4,500 for the deciding game on April 19. The 'Marksmen' could only field 10 players after their captain, Alex McNab, broke his arm in a midweek friendly and the club had neglected to bring along any reserves. Despite this they still managed to win 2–0 with goals from Patenaude and Gordon Burness.

The 'Marksmen' were not the only club to relocate, merge or disappear. This has made it difficult to follow the teams as they progressed through this year's competition. To muddy the waters more, the Providence F.C. had been bought by a group of Fall River businessmen and moved to that city to replace the 'Marksmen'. The 'Gold Bugs' were then renamed Fall River F.C. Furthermore, after the 'Gold Bugs' had moved to Fall River to become Fall River F.C., it merged with the New Bedford Whalers. As these teams had all played initial Challenge Cup games, the results become difficult to follow.

== Eastern Division ==
First round
January 10 - February 1
Fall River F.C.	1st
Providence F.C.	2nd
New Bedford Whalers	3rd
Pawtucket Rangers	4th
January 11 - Rochester
Rochester Celtic	2
Fore River	3
January 11 - New York
New York Galicia	2
Tappen Post	1
January 11 - February 15
Hakoah All-Stars	1st
New York Giants	2nd
New York Soccer Club	3rd
Brooklyn Wanderers	4th
January 11 - Newark
Newark Americans	3
Newark Portuguese	0
January 11 - Dundalk
BS Baltimore	7
Trenton Highlanders	1

Second round
Fall River F.C.
Won Round Robin
January 25 - Quincy
Fore River	2
New York Galicia	5
Hakoah All-Stars
Won Round Robin
January 25 - Newark
Newark Americans	6
BS Baltimore	1

Semi-finals
February 23 - New Bedford
Fall River F.C.	6
New York Galicia	2
February 22/March 15
Hakoah All-Stars	1-0
Newark Americans	2-2

Final
March 22 - New York
Fall River F.C.	6
Newark Americans	1

== Western Division ==
First round
January 11 - St. Louis
Ben Millers	5
Tablers	3
January 31 - St. Louis
Kavanaughs	8
Hellrungs and Grimm	2
January 25 - Cleveland
Cleveland Slavia	3
Bruell Hungarian	2
February 16 - Cleveland
Cleveland Shamrock	1
Morgan F.C.	3
February 8 - Chicago
Chicago Bricklayers	3
Olympia F.C.	0
February 8 - Chicago
Sparta ABA	4
Maccabee All-Stars	0
February 8 - Chicago
Swedish Americans	4
Norwegian Americans	0
February 1 - Detroit
Liberty F.C.	0
Workers A.C.	2

Second round
February 8 - St. Louis
Ben Millers	2
Kavanaughs	1
February 22 - Cleveland
Cleveland Slavia	2
Morgan F.C.	1
February 15 - Chicago
Chicago Bricklayers	2
Sparta ABA	1
February 15, 22 - Chicago
Swedish Americans	4-2
Workers A.C.	4-1

Semi-finals
March 1 - St. Louis
Ben Millers	2
Cleveland Slavia	1
March 1 - Chicago
Chicago Bricklayers	4
Swedish Americans	1

Final
March 8, 15
Ben Millers	2-0
Chicago Bricklayers	7-1

Round Robin groups for Quarterfinal qualifying.

New York	Pts	Pld	W	L	T	GF	GA	GD
Hakoah All-Stars	8	6	4	2	0	7	9	-2
New York Giants	7	6	3	2	1	17	13	+4
New York Soccer Club	5	6	2	3	1	13	12	+1
Brooklyn Wanderers	4	6	2	4	0	11	16	-5

New England	Pts	Pld	W	L	T	GF	GA	GD
Fall River F.C.	10	6	4	0	2	19	7	+12
Providence F.C.	6	6	2	2	2	11	9	+2
New Bedford Whalers	6	6	2	2	2	11	13	-2
Pawtucket Rangers	2	6	0	4	2	9	21	-12

== Final ==
=== First game ===
April 5, 1931

Fall River F.C. (MA)	6–2	Chicago Bricklayers (IL)
Patenaude,,,, McPherson	Report	Cuthbert; Greenlees

Polo Grounds, New York, New York
Attendance: 12,000
Referee: Charles Creighton, New York (USA)

=== Second game ===
April 12, 1931

Chicago Bricklayers (IL)	1–1	Fall River F.C. (MA)
Gregg 57' (pen.)		Gonsalves 40'

Mills Stadium, Chicago, Illinois
Attendance: 8,000
Referee: Jack Johnstone (USA)

=== Second game (replay) ===
April 19, 1931

Chicago Bricklayers (IL)	0–2	Fall River F.C. (MA)
		Patenaude; Burness (pen.)

Sparta Field, Chicago, Illinois
Attendance: 4,500
Referee: Harry Pithie, Detroit, (USA)

== Sources ==
- Jose, Colin (1998). American Soccer League, 1921-1931 (Hardback). The Scarecrow Press. (ISBN 0-8108-3429-4).
- 1931 U.S. Open Cup Results
