= Henry Farrell (soccer) =

American soccer player

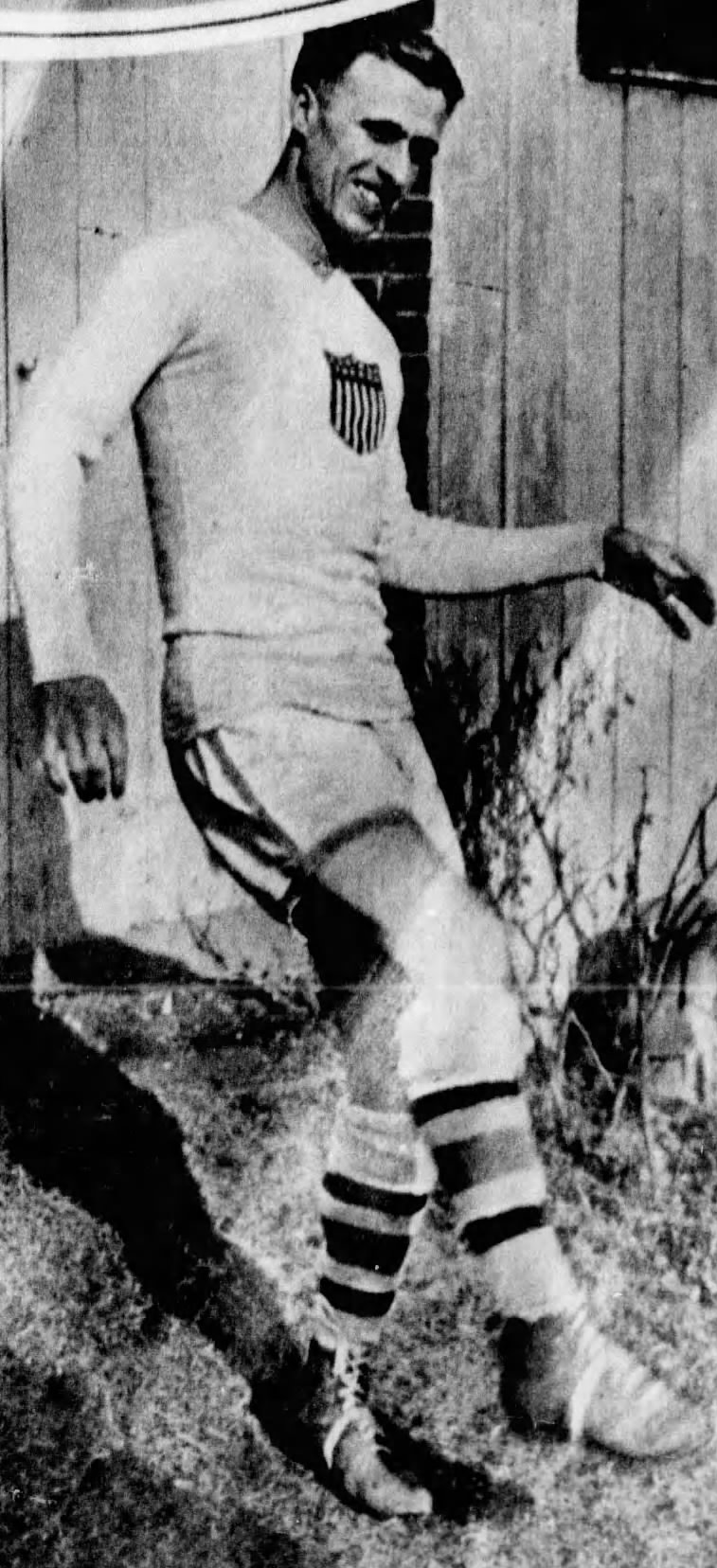

Personal information
- Full name: Henry Charles Farrell
- Date of birth: October 2, 1902
- Place of birth: Philadelphia, Pennsylvania, U.S.
- Date of death: May 1980
- Place of death: Mantua Township, New Jersey, U.S.
- Position: Wing Forward

Senior career*
Years	Team	Apps	(Gls)
1926–1927	Philadelphia Field Club	1	(0)
1927–1928	New York Nationals	15	(8)
1928	Philadelphia Field Club	3	(0)
1928–1929	Jersey City	3	(0)
1929	Philadelphia Field Club	1	(1)

International career
1924	United States	2	(0)
- * Club domestic league appearances and goals

Henry Farrell (October 2, 1902 in Philadelphia, Pennsylvania – May 1980 in Mantua Township, New Jersey) was a U.S. soccer forward. Farrell earned two caps with the U.S. national team, both at the 1924 Summer Olympics.

== American Soccer League ==
In 1926, Farrell joined the Philadelphia Field Club of the American Soccer League. He saw time in only one game and transferred to the New York Nationals for the 1927–1928 season.

Farrell had an exceptional exhibition season in 1927–28. He represented Philadelphia's All-Star teams against the touring Hakoah Vienna in April and May 1927 - scoring in both matches. In July, he played against Maccabee FC and tallied another goal. August 11, 1928, he appeared for the West Pennsylvania All-Stars (Philadelphia) against the visiting Italian select side. The following day he traveled to New York City to again play the Italian team, as a member of the New York Nationals of the American Soccer League.

He failed to make the 1928 Olympic Team because he was denied amateur status and returned to Philadelphia for the 1928–1929 season before moving to Jersey City for the remainder of the schedule. He finished his career with Philadelphia in the 1929 fall season.

== National team ==
Farrell's first game as a member of the National Team was a 1–0 win over Estonia. In his second, the team lost to Uruguay in the quarterfinals.
