= Jake Green =

Jake Green may refer to:

- Jake Green (rower) (born 1994), South African rower
- Jake Green (voice actor), American voice actor
- Jake Green (Jericho), fictional character portrayed by Skeet Ulrich on the TV series Jericho

== See also ==
- Jacob Green (born 1957), American football player
- Jacob D. Green (fl. 1813–1848), African-American writer and lecturer
- Jack Green (disambiguation)
