= Red Ballantyne =

Scottish footballer (1901–1944)

Personal information
- Full name: William McCaw Ballantyne
- Date of birth: 15 November 1901
- Place of birth: Possilpark, Scotland
- Date of death: 7 August 1944 (aged 42)
- Place of death: Lachine, Montreal, Canada
- Position: Inside right

Senior career*
| Years | Team | Apps | (Gls) |
- Shettleston
| 1922–1924 | Clyde | 38 | (9) |
| 1924–1925 | Boston | 35 | (2) |
| 1925–1927 | Clyde | 66 | (19) |
| 1927–1928 | New Bedford Whalers | | |
| 1928–1930 | New York Giants | 63 | (23) |
| 1930–1931 | Brooklyn Wanderers | | |
- New York Americans
- Kearny Scots-Americans
- Newark Germans

Managerial career
- Newark Germans
- * Club domestic league appearances and goals

William McCaw "Red" Ballantyne (15 November 1901 – 7 August 1944) was a Scottish association football inside right who played in Scotland, the United States, and Canada.

Ballantyne played for both Morton and Clyde, before jumping to the Boston Soccer Club of the American Soccer League in 1924. He was back in Scotland with Clyde a year later. After two seasons with Clyde, Ballantyne returned to the United States to sign with the New Bedford Whalers. In 1928, he began the season with the Whalers, but the onset of the soccer wars between the league and the United States Football Association brought considerable turmoil to the professional scene. The Whalers briefly left the ASL for the newly created outlaw league, the Eastern Soccer League. After a handful of games, it returned to the ASL. However, Ballantyne refused to make the move back to the ASL and joined the New York Giants in the ESL. This move occurred by December 1928. He remained with the Giants after the ASL merged with the ESL in 1930. In the fall of 1930, Ballantyne joined the Brooklyn Wanderers. He then signed with the New York Americans and later played for Montréal Carsteel and then the Kearny Scots-Americans in the second ASL after the original league collapsed in 1933. He was with the Newark Germans in 1935 as a player-manager.

His elder brother Johnny and younger brother Bobby were also footballers who played for clubs in Scotland and the United States.

In 1938, he immigrated to Montreal, where he was manager of Glen Yards F.C. and Carsteel F.C. In 1944, after a 10-month illness, he died at a convalescent hospital in Lachine, Montreal.
