= Barney Battles Jr. =

Footballer (1905–1979)

Personal information
- Full name: Bernard Joseph Battles
- Date of birth: 12 October 1905
- Place of birth: Musselburgh, Haddingtonshire, Scotland
- Date of death: 15 November 1979 (aged 74)
- Place of death: Edinburgh, Scotland
- Height: 5 ft 9 in (1.75 m)
- Position: Striker

Youth career
- Boston Celtics

Senior career*
Years	Team	Apps	(Gls)
1924–1928	Boston Soccer Club	116	(41)
1928–1936	Heart of Midlothian	148	(133)
Total		264	(174)

International career
1925	United States	1	(0)
1928–1930	Scottish League XI	5	(13)
1930	Scotland	1	(1)
- * Club domestic league appearances and goals

Bernard "Barney" Joseph Battles Jr. (12 October 1905 – 15 November 1979) was a footballer who played as a striker for Boston Soccer Club and Heart of Midlothian. A dual-internationalist, he represented both Scotland and the United States at full international level.

== Family and early life ==
Battles was born on 12 October 1905 in Musselburgh, Scotland and is the son of former Scotland internationalist Barney Battles Sr., who played for and won honors with both Celtic and Heart of Midlothian, amongst others, in the 1890s and 1900s. Battles Sr contracted pneumonia and died aged 30, before the birth of his son, who was named in his memory. The monies taken from the stand at the 1905 Scotland v Ireland match at Celtic Park were donated by host club Celtic to the grieving Battles family in tribute to their former player.

Battles Jr was raised in the Edinburgh area, where he attended the city's Holy Cross RC Academy, and developed his footballing skills in the city's inter-school competitions. While he was still a teenager, his mother decided to emigrate to the United States, and Battles and an elder sister accompanied her across the Atlantic.

== Career ==
=== In the United States ===
On his arrival in the U.S., Battles began playing for the Boston Celtics, a Sullivan Square team. While playing for the Celtics, he caught the attention of a scout from the Boston Soccer Club. Although not enjoying the popular status of baseball, soccer (as the sport was known) was buoyant in 1920s America, boosted by a ready supply of talent from the country's numerous immigrant communities and significant corporate investment from industrial giants such as the Bethlehem Steel Corporation. Aged 19, Battles was offered a contract with the newly founded Boston Soccer Club, playing in the American Soccer League (ASL). The club recruited extensively from British football and among his teammates were fellow Scots Johnny Ballantyne and Alex McNab, while former Rangers player Tommy Muirhead was appointed player-manager.

Despite his youth and the talent of his teammates, Battles enjoyed a successful first season with Boston, scoring seven goals in eighteen games, as the Wonder Workers won the 1925 Lewis Cup and the American Professional Soccer Championship. The latter was a three-game series held between representatives of the ASL and the St. Louis Soccer League in an attempt to determine a "national champion": due to geographical restrictions, the ASL primarily consisted of sides from the North-Eastern states, while the St. Louis area had been a traditional stronghold of American soccer. Battles played an important role in helping the Wonder Workers to a surprise 2–1 series win over the St Louis representatives, the Ben Millers, scoring the third goal in a 3–1 win in Boston and the deciding goal in a 3–2 victory in St Louis.

That same year, Battles was chosen to represent the United States National side, earning what would prove to be his only American cap against Canada. Selected as an outside right, he couldn't prevent the side from suffering a 1–0 defeat in Montreal.

Battles maintained a consistent level of form over the next three seasons, scoring in double figures in the 1926 and 1928 ASL campaigns and helping the Wonder Workers regain the Lewis Cup in 1927. The Boston side won the ASL title in 1928, however, at the season's conclusion, a dispute between league officials and the United States Soccer Federation destabilised the Wonder Workers and most other ASL clubs. This so-called "Soccer War", combined with the beginnings of the Great Depression, led to severe financial difficulties for the club and Battles was one of several players to leave, opting to return to the land of his birth.

=== In Scotland ===
Battles arrived back in Scotland in 1928, joining Hearts for a reported £9-per-week wage. His impact was immediate, as he scored 6 times during two intra-squad pre-season trial games. More remarkably, the first of these exhibition games drew a crowd of 18,000, primarily to see the new recruit in action. He scored on his competitive debut, in a 3–1 defeat of Queens Park at Hampden Park, and followed that up by scoring twice in his next game and notching a hat-trick on his third Hearts appearance. By the end of the 1928–29 season he had scored a club record 31 goals in 28 League games as Hearts finished in 4th position and was attracting transfer attention from the pre-eminent English sides of the era, Arsenal and Huddersfield Town.

These overtures were resisted by the club's board, to the delight of the Hearts support, amongst whom Battles had quickly become a favourite, thanks in the main to an extraordinary feat of scoring against local rivals Hibernian. The sides contested three Derby matches at the season's end, in the Finals of various local cup competitions, during which Battles managed to strike eleven times. He scored five times in an 8–2 triumph in the Dunedin Cup, twice in a 5–1 win in the Wilson Cup and four times in another 5–1 win in the Rosebery Charity Cup. Including the five goals Battles scored while representing the Scottish League against the Irish League (in an 8–2 win), he scored a total of 68 in all competitions that season.

Battles continued to score freely the following season, although Hearts inconsistent form ensured they finished no higher than 10th in the League, while Rangers overwhelmed them in the Scottish Cup semi-finals. He was again selected for the Scottish League representative side and again the Irish League was to suffer as a consequence, with Battles notching all his side's goals in a 4–1 win at Windsor Park, Belfast.

1930–31 witnessed Battles reach the pinnacle of his goal-scoring exploits, both in the maroon of Hearts and the dark blue of Scotland. His final season's tally in the league, 44, not only surpassed his previous club record but ensured he was the top scorer in Scotland that season. This feat included a run of three consecutive matches in which he scored a hat-trick in November and was especially notable as he had missed several games while recuperating from appendicitis. Having again impressed in an inter-League match against the Irish League earlier in the month (he only scored three times on this occasion), Battles was awarded his first cap against Wales on 25 October 1930. He scored Scotland's equalising goal in a 1–1 draw at Ibrox but was never to have another opportunity at that level, largely due to the standing of his contemporary and rival for the center-forward berth, Hughie Gallacher.

The following year was largely disrupted by injury, with Battles requiring surgery in September 1932 to correct a problem with his knee cartilage. This would prove to be a persistent and recurring concern but while there may have been doubts concerning his health, Battles renowned goal-scoring prowess was not in question, as he demonstrated in a match against Cowdenbeath at Tynecastle during the 1933–34 season. With Hearts trailing 4–1 with only twenty minutes of the game remaining, Battles rallied his side by scoring four times, helping them recover to a 5–4 victory.

The arrival of Dave McCulloch from Third Lanark in 1934 demoted Battles from the starting line-up and he decided to take a year's leave from his footballing commitments. This was in part a period of recuperation for his troublesome knee but it also allowed him the time to train as a masseuse. He returned to Hearts for a final season in 1935–36 but was unable to recapture his pre-injury form or earn consistent selection for the first team, even after McCulloch's mid-season departure to Brentford. He finally retired from professional football in April 1936, aged only 30, his last match being a 2–1 home defeat by Aberdeen. In total he had scored 218 goals in 200 competitive games with Hearts.

A later attempt by former Hearts manager Willie McCartney, then in charge of Hibs, to lure him back to the field was rebuffed by Battles, who stated his opinion that "Hibs...did not want to be embarrassed with my presence. I did not feel fit, much though I would have liked to resume playing"

== Retirement and later life ==
After his playing retirement, Battles worked as a physiotherapist before in the 1950s becoming a successful sports journalist with firstly the Glasgow Evening Times then the Edinburgh Evening Dispatch. He later became a publican in the Newhaven district of Edinburgh. He maintained an interest in Hearts after his journalistic retirement and was a regular spectator at Tynecastle during the 1970s. He died aged 74, in November 1979, and is buried in Edinburgh's Mount Vernon cemetery.

== See also ==
- List of association footballers who have been capped for two senior national teams
- List of United States men's international soccer players born outside the United States
