= Dave McEachran =

Scottish footballer

Personal information
- Date of birth: 5 December 1903
- Place of birth: Clydebank, Scotland
- Date of death: 21 January 1983 (aged 79)
- Place of death: Brampton, Ontario, Canada
- Position: Wing Forward

Youth career
- Brown's Welfare

Senior career*
Years	Team	Apps	(Gls)
- Kirkintilloch Rob Roy
	Clydebank	0	(0)
1924	Vale of Leven	14	(2)
1924–1926	Clydebank	62	(11)
1926	Preston North End	1	(0)
1926	Clydebank	0	(0)
1926–1928	Fall River	74	(26)
1928	Boston Soccer Club	7	(6)
1928	IRT Rangers	7	(2)
1929	Boston Soccer Club	24	(9)
1929	Boston Bears	19	(10)
1929	New Bedford Whalers	8	(4)
1929–1930	Providence	13	(5)
1930–1932	Montréal Carsteel FC		
1932	St Johnstone	4	(1)
1932	Beith		
1932–1933	Linfield	7	(2)
- * Club domestic league appearances and goals

David McEachran (5 December 1903 – 21 January 1983) was a Scottish football wing forward who played professionally in Scotland, Northern Ireland, England, Canada and the United States.

== Career ==
In January 1924 McEachran signed with Vale of Leven F.C. in the Scottish Football League. In July 1924, he transferred to Clydebank. In 1926, he moved to Preston North End of The Football League, playing only one league game on 2 April 1926. That summer, he left Britain to sign with the Fall River in the American Soccer League. In May 1927, the 'Marksmen' crushed Holley Carburetor F.C. in the 1927 National Challenge Cup final. McEachran scored two of the 'Marksmen' goals in their 7–0 victory. He began the 1927–28 season with the 'Marksmen' before transferring to the Boston Soccer Club at the end of the season.

When the ASL was declared an "outlaw league" in the summer of 1928, McEachran moved to the IRT Rangers in the Eastern Soccer League, a rival league created by United States Football Association. He appeared to have returned to the 'Wonder Workers' that season as he played twenty-four games in 1928–29. The 'Wonder Workers' folded at the end of the season and McEachran moved to the Boston Bears for the fall 1929 season. He then transferred to the New Bedford Whalers for the 1929–1930 season. After eight games, he moved to the Providence Gold Bugs. In May 1930, he moved to Canada where he played with Montréal Carsteel FC of the National Soccer League, winning the Carls-Rite Cup as a member of the Montreal all-star team. He was in Montreal as late as October 1932 when Montréal Carsteel FC lost the league championship to Toronto Ulster.

He returned to Scotland and signed with St Johnstone in November 1932, though his contract was cancelled one month later. He then played briefly for Beith. His career ended in 1933 due to a knee injury while playing for Linfield in Northern Ireland.
