= James G. K. McClure =

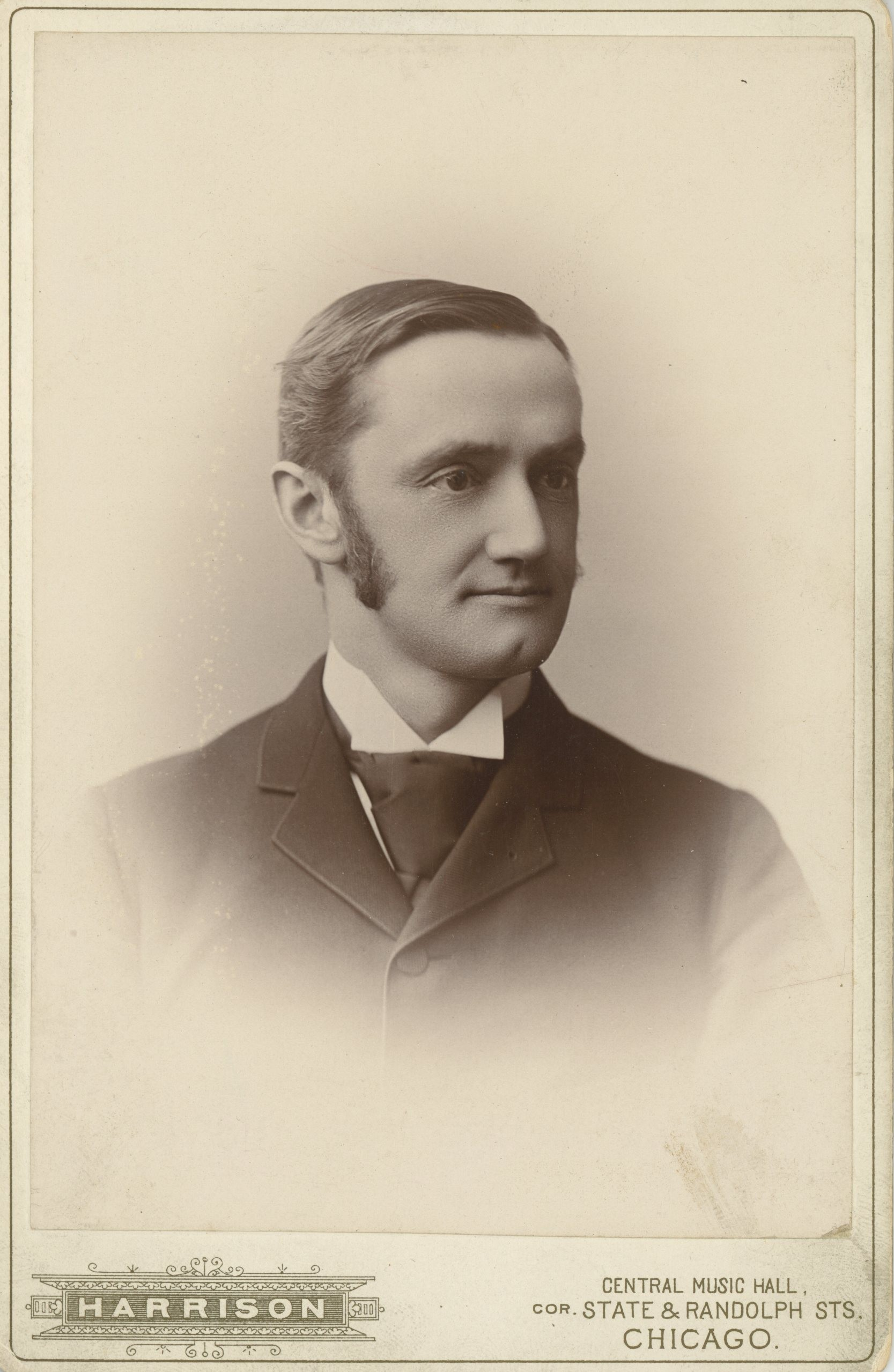
James G.K. McClure, circa 1883

James Gore King McClure (November 24, 1848 – January 18, 1932) was an American Presbyterian minister, author, and educator best known for his long tenure as pastor of the First Presbyterian Church of Lake Forest and for his service as president of Lake Forest College and later the McCormick Theological Seminary. He was a prominent figure in the religious and civic life of Lake Forest, Illinois, and his influence extended into education, publishing, and institutional leadership.

== Early life and education ==
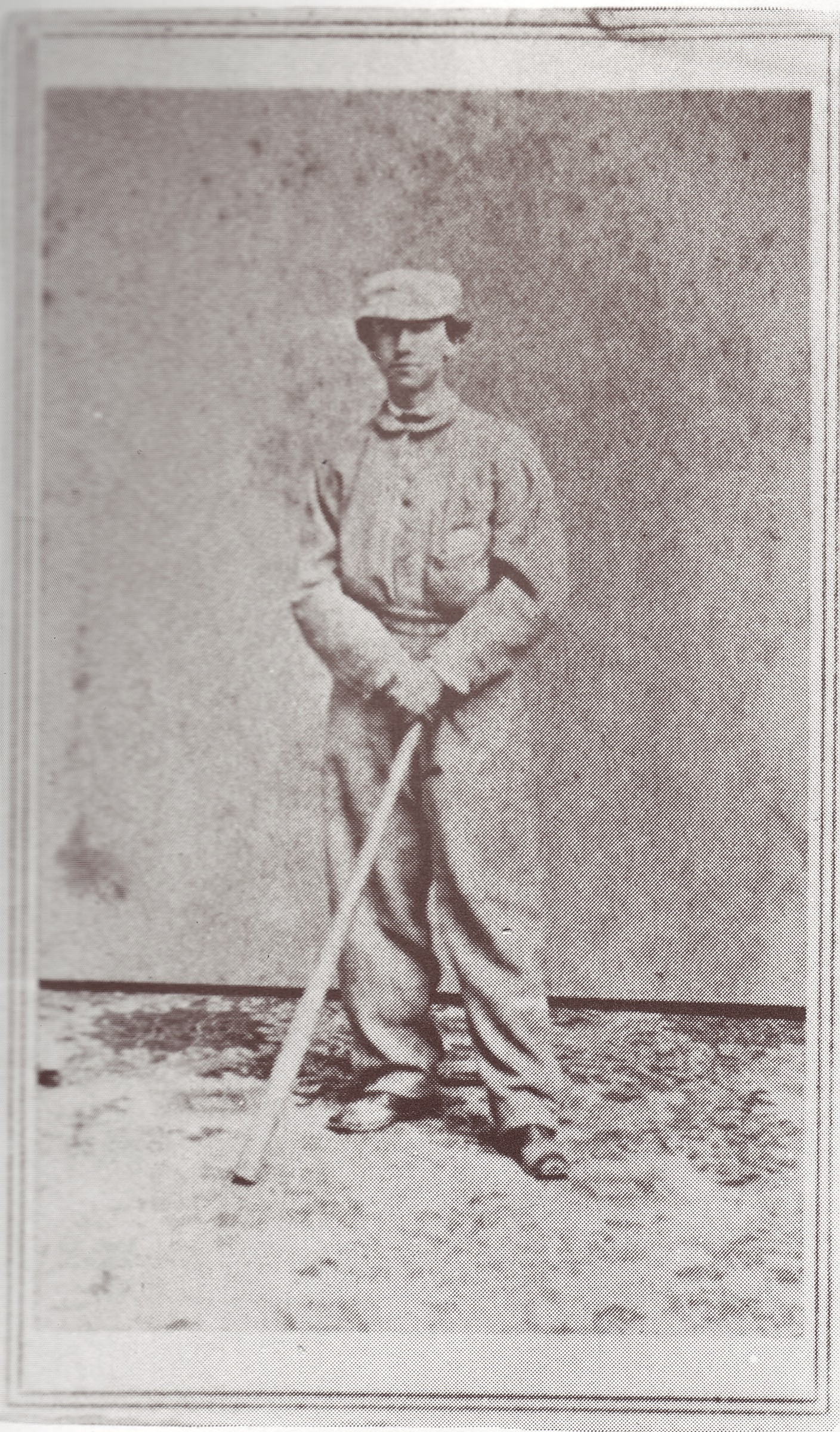
James McClure on Yale's baseball team, circa 1870

McClure was born in Albany, New York on November 24, 1848, to Archibald McClure and Susan Tracy Rice McClure. He graduated from Phillips Academy in 1866 and later attended Yale University, graduating in 1870 with an A.B. degree. At Yale he served as captain of the baseball team his senior year. McClure also took a post-graduate course at the Princeton Theological Seminary and graduated with high honors in preparation for a career in the Presbyterian ministry. He received his Doctor of Divinity degree in 1888 from Lake Forest University, and Doctor of Laws from Lake Forest University and Illinois College.

== Career ==
McClure was ordained in the Presbyterian ministry in 1874. His first pastorate was in New Scotland, New York, where he served for five years. In 1881 McClure became pastor of the First Presbyterian Church of Lake Forest, where he served for approximately twenty-five years. During that time, he played an important role in shaping the civic and social life of Lake Forest and was also associated with Lake Forest University, where he intermittently served as president. For the academic year 1892-1893 he served as Acting President, and during that time he wrote a ten-page report to the trustees about Lake Forest University. The prior spring he had served as the university's Baccalaureate speaker, a role he reprised in 1901. McClure was officially made President from 1897 Fall through 1901 Spring.

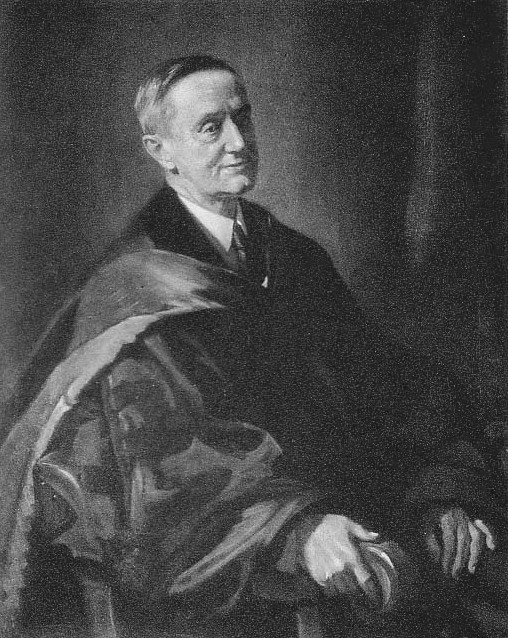
James McClure portrait, circa 1908

In 1879 and 1880, McClure traveled in Greece and elsewhere in Europe, Turkey, Egypt, and Palestine.

McClure became the first president of the McCormick Theological Seminary in Chicago, serving from 1905 to 1929. In 1907 he contributed a section on the McCormick Theological Seminary to Andrew Stevenson's book, Chicago: Pre-Eminently a Presbyterian City. He later wrote a book on the Seminary for its centennial in 1929. He had returned to Lake Forest College in 1921 to make the historical address at President Herbert M. Moore's inauguration.

In addition to his pastoral and administrative work, McClure was an author of religious and devotional works. Titles attributed to him include Possibilities, The Man Who Wanted to Help, The Great Appeal, Supreme Things, Environment, Hearts That Hope, A Mighty Means of Usefulness, Living for the Best, The Growing Pastor, The Supreme Book of Mankind: The Origin and Influence of the English Bible, and Loyalty. He was a regular preacher to the students of Harvard, Yale, Princeton, West Point, and the United States Naval Academy.

== Personal life ==
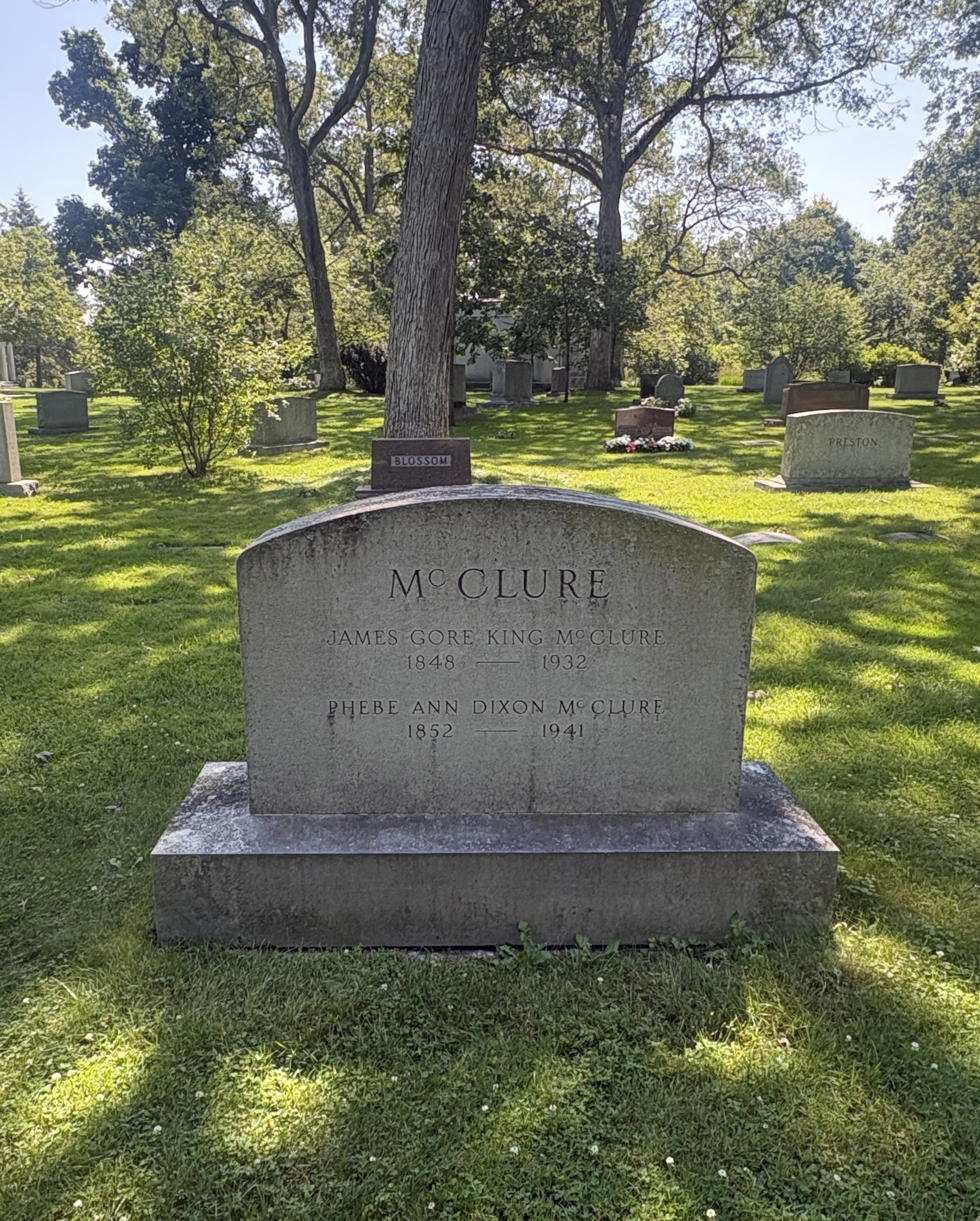
McClure's grave at Lake Forest Cemetery

McClure married Annie Phoebe Dixon on November 19, 1879. The couple had five children, including James Gore King McClure Jr. (1884–1956), who later became a Presbyterian minister and cooperative leader in North Carolina. Family references and archival materials also connect the McClure family to later generations active in Lake Forest civic and philanthropic life.

McClure's Scottish ancestors had come to North America on the Mayflower, and he served as deputy governor general of the Mayflower Descendants in the United States.

McClure died in Lake Forest at age 83, on January 18, 1932, and is buried in Lake Forest Cemetery.
