= Jack Green (footballer, born 1947) =

Australian rules footballer (born 1947)

Personal information
- Full name: Jack William Green
- Born: 2 August 1947 (age 79)
- Original team: Broadford
- Height: 185 cm (6 ft 1 in)
- Weight: 86 kg (190 lb)

Playing career^{1}
Years	Club	Games (Goals)
1967–1969	Collingwood	18 (2)
- ^{1} Playing statistics correct to the end of 1969.

Jack William Green (born 2 August 1947) is a former Australian rules footballer who played with Collingwood in the Victorian Football League (VFL).

Green, who was recruited from Broadford, was the third Jack Green to play for Collingwood. His father played 127 for Collingwood from 1938 to 1949 and his grandfather was a Collingwood premiership player.

A half back, Green made 18 appearances for Collingwood, 11 of them in the 1968 VFL season.

He later played at Preston in the Victorian Football Association.
