= Aspden =

Valley in Lancashire, England

Coordinates: 53.75129°N 2.40335°W

Aspden is the historic name of a valley a mile west of Church and a mile north of Oswaldtwistle, between Accrington and Blackburn, in Lancashire, England. The modern name of this location is Aspen.

By 1990, there were three houses there: Aspen Cottage, a large ruinous farm, and a large house, apparently Elizabethan, which has in its grounds a small plain house, said to be older. The valley is bounded on three sides by a loop of the Leeds and Liverpool Canal, and on the fourth by a high railway embankment (Aspen Viaduct). On the other side of the canal, overlooking the valley, is the Accrington and District Golf Club.

The road into the valley is now called Lower Aspen Lane upon which is located Lower Aspen Farm. The OS grid reference is grid reference SD735284. The postcode is BB5 4NY. A map of the location may be found here.

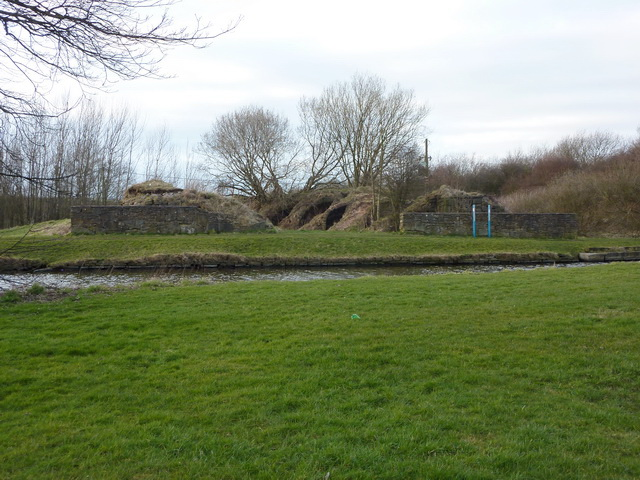
Remains of Aspen Colliery (2011)

Aspen Colliery (disused by 1930) is now a scheduled ancient monument.

The national and international significance of Aspden is that it is the source of the surname Aspden which is common in east Lancashire and has now spread elsewhere in England, North Wales and the English speaking world. Adam de Aspden is seen witnessing charters through a period beginning in 1262. By the 1380s the Aspden estate (inherited by Elizabeth, daughter of Roger de Aspden and wife of John Grimshaw) amounted to some 400 acres (1.6 km^{2}), of which 40 was land, 40 was meadow, 20 was wood and 200 was pasture.
