= Jersey City (soccer) =

Jersey City was an American soccer club based in Jersey City, New Jersey that was briefly a member of the professional American Soccer League. They joined for the second half of the 1928/29 season, but folded after only seven games. Their final game on February 10, 1929, was a 4-2 loss to Providence, at which point they 4 points from 2 wins, 5 losses, and no draws.

== Year-by-year ==
Year	Division	League	Reg. season	Playoffs	U.S. Open Cup
1928-29	1	ASL	9th	No playoff	Did not enter
