= Red McMillan =

Scottish footballer

Personal information
- Full name: Tommy McMillan
- Place of birth: Scotland
- Position: Fullback

Senior career*
Years	Team	Apps	(Gls)
- Kirkintilloch Rob
- Dunfermline Athletic
1924–1927	Boston	102	(0)
1927–1931	New Bedford Whalers	205	(0)
- * Club domestic league appearances and goals

Tommy "Red" McMillan was a Scottish association football fullback who played in the American Soccer League.

McMillan played for Kirkintilloch Rob Roy F.C. and Dunfermline Athletic F.C. before moving to the United States where he signed with Boston Soccer Club in 1924. In 1927, he moved to the New Bedford Whalers. During McMillan's three seasons with Boston, the team won the ASL league cup twice (1925 and 1927). McMillan played for New Bedford until at least the end of the 1931 season. However, the team went through several name changes. In the spring of 1931, it became Fall River F.C. Then in the fall of 1931, it merged with the New York Yankees and retook the Whalers name.
