= Jimmy McConnell =

Scottish footballer

Personal information
- Full name: James McConnell
- Date of birth: 23 February 1899
- Place of birth: Ayr, Scotland
- Date of death: 1949 (aged 49–50)
- Position: Centre forward

Senior career*
Years	Team	Apps	(Gls)
–	Auchinleck Talbot		
1920	Kilmarnock	1	(1)
1921	Stevenston United		
1921–1925	Nithsdale Wanderers		
1925–1926	Celtic	0	(0)
1926	Springfield Babes	3	(0)
1926–1927	Providence Clamdiggers	21	(17)
1927	Bethlehem Steel	10	(7)
1927–1928	J&P Coats	23	(12)
1928–1932	Carlisle United	149	(124)
1932–1933	Crewe Alexandra	36	(22)
1933–1934	Rotherham United	21	(4)
–	Nithsdale Wanderers		
- * Club domestic league appearances and goals

James McConnell (23 February 1899 – 1949) was a Scottish professional footballer born in Ayr who played as a centre forward in the English Football League for Carlisle United, Crewe Alexandra and Rotherham United.

McConnell began his football career following service during World War I. In June 1920, he played one game, scoring one goal, for Kilmarnock F.C. In February 1921, he joined Stevenston United F.C. In May 1921, his professional career began with Nithsdale Wanderers. In 1926, McConnell moved to the United States where he joined the Springfield Babes. He played only three games with Springfield before being sent to Providence. In August 1927, McConnell moved to Bethlehem Steel. He got off to a quick start, scoring seven goals in Bethlehem's first eight games of the season. When his production dried up, Bethlehem shipped him to J&P Coats. In 1928, McConnell moved to English side Carlisle United. He later played in England for Crewe Alexandra before retiring from football in 1934.
