= Suzanne Aspden =

New Zealand musicologist

Suzanne Aspden (born August 1968) is a New Zealand musicologist and cultural historian who has been a tutorial fellow and associate professor in music at Jesus College, University of Oxford since 2005.

== Life ==
Aspden was a research fellow at Robinson College, Cambridge from 1999 to 2002 and a lecturer in music at the University of Southampton from 2002 to 2005. In 2002-3 she was the first John Marshall and Marie Louise Osborn Fellow at the Beinecke Library, Yale University.

Aspden was formerly a co-editor of the Cambridge Opera Journal. She is currently a governor of the Crypt School in Gloucester.

Aspden appeared in an edition of the BBC Radio 3 programme Record Review in June 2019.

== Selected publications ==
- Editor, Operatic Geographies: The Place of Opera and the Opera House. Chicago: University of Chicago Press, 2019. ISBN 9780226595962.
- The Rival Sirens: Performance and Identity on Handel’s Operatic Stage. Cambridge: Cambridge University Press, 2013. ISBN 9781107033375.
- Co-editor with Suzanne M. Lodato and Walter Bernhart, Essays in Honor of Stephen Paul Scher and on Cultural Identity and the Musical Stage. Amsterdam: Rodopi, 2002. ISBN 9042010037.
