= Jack Green (footballer, born 1919) =

Australian rules footballer, born 1919

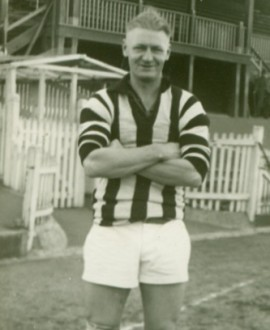
- Green during his Collingwood career

Personal information
- Full name: Jack Taylor Green
- Born: 26 August 1919
- Died: 23 July 1981 (aged 61)
- Original team: Northcote Stars
- Height: 180 cm (5 ft 11 in)
- Weight: 81 kg (179 lb)

Playing career^{1}
| Years | Club | Games (Goals) |
| 1938–1949 | Collingwood | 127 (63) |
- ^{1} Playing statistics correct to the end of 1949.

Jack Taylor Green (26 August 1919 – 23 July 1981) was an Australian rules footballer who played with Collingwood in the Victorian Football League (VFL).

Green, a follower and defender, was Collingwood's 19th man in the 1939 VFL Grand Final, which they lost to Melbourne. He was the son of Jack W. Green, who was a Collingwood premiership player in 1917. His own son, also named Jack, played in the VFL as well, for Collingwood in the 1960s. After leaving Collingwood he joined the Warragul Football Club, as playing coach.
