= Jack Green (soccer) =

English-Canadian soccer player

Personal information
- Full name: John Green
- Place of birth: Blackpool, England
- Date of death: December 13, 1960
- Place of death: Victoria, British Columbia, Canada
- Position: Inside forward

Senior career*
Years	Team	Apps	(Gls)
1924–1926	Montréal Carsteel FC		
1926–1927	Providence	35	(6)
1927	Montreal Carsteel		
1928–1929	Providence	37	(14)
1929–1930	Montreal CNR		
- * Club domestic league appearances and goals

John "Jack" Green was an English-Canadian soccer inside forward who played professionally in Canada and the American Soccer League.

In 1924, Green began his career with Montréal Carsteel FC. In the fall of 1926, Green moved south to join Providence F.C. of the American Soccer League. In May 1927, Green was back with Carsteel. In August 1927, he was the victim of a hit-and-run accident which nearly cost him his life. He took nearly a year to recover. When he did, he returned to Providence F.C. for the 1928–29 American Soccer League season. That year, he finished the season ranked fifteenth on the league’s scoring list. In 1929, he returned to Canada where he played for Montreal CNR in the National Soccer League. That year, CNR won the Canada FA Trophy. In 1930, Green and his teammates fell to the Westminster Royals in a three-game final.

Green may have played for Grenadier Guards during his career, but in 1937, he was still playing for Montreal CNR, now known as CNR Scottish.
