= Jack Green (geologist) =

American geologist (1925–2014)

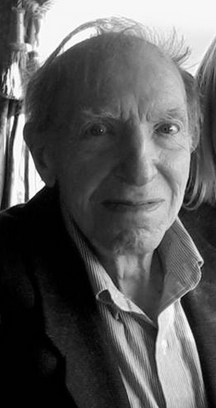
Green in 2013

Jack Green (18 June 1925 – 5 September 2014) was a geologist and geology professor at California State University Long Beach. His active research covered topics such as general volcanology and economic geology, as well as mineralogy, lunar protolife, lunar volcanism, water on the Moon and astrobiology. His passion for volcanology and the Moon primarily involved trying to prove that lunar craters were volcanic rather than the results of asteroid impacts, and therefore, there would be water on the Moon which would support life. He collaborated with Urey, Shoemaker, Kuiper and others during the "Space Age" heyday, and was active in planning several conferences on remote sensing and the Moon.

Jack Green became best known for his 1971 book, co-edited with Nicholas Short, Volcanic landforms and surface features, a photographic atlas and glossary.
