= James Warren McClure =

Newspaper executive

- Born: September 25, 1919; Clairton, Pennsylvania
- Died: 2004
- Education: Northwestern University (MBA)
- Occupation: Publisher
- Spouse(s): Helen Oppegard (divorced); Lois Howe Ricker McClure
- Parent(s): James H. (father); Elva Hageman McClure (mother)

James Warren McClure (September 25, 1919 – 2004) was a newspaper executive and publisher.

== Biography ==
Son of James H. and Elva Hageman McClure, James Warren McClure was a newspaper executive and publisher born in Clairton, Pennsylvania. He graduated from Ohio University in August, 1940, with a Bachelor of Science in Commerce degree and from Northwestern University in August, 1941, with an MBA. In 1942, McClure married Helen Oppegard, a fellow Northwestern student. After serving with the U.S. Navy during World War II, McClure entered the newspaper business as an advertising executive and business manager for the Grand Forks Herald (ND).

In July 1952, he had joined The Burlington Free Press (Vermont), and in 1961 became the newspaper's major owner and publisher. Following a 1952 divorce, he married Lois Howe Ricker of Burlington in 1954. In 1971, McClure sold his newspaper holdings (including the Chambersburg (PA) Public Opinion, purchased in 1964) to Gannett Co. Inc. The sale made McClure Gannett's largest individual stockholder, and he became Gannett's first vice president of marketing and was elected to the board of directors.

McClure retired from Gannett in 1975 but continued to serve on their board. He then started McClure Media Marketing Motivation Company, which conducted marketing and motivational seminars throughout the country and Canada, and developed the Ener/Gem Success System. The McClures began making substantial financial donations to major educational, health, and community organization projects in the early 1970s. McClure retired in 1978 and died in 2004.

== Publications ==
- James Warren McClure; Barbara M. Benedict; Lois H. McClure (2000). "Hands-on" Philanthropy. Charlotte, Vt.: J. Warren McClure. OCLC 46638323.
- Freedom to Achieve. Wilmette, Ill.: Ener/Gem Success Systems. 1980. OCLC 11074531.
- James Warren McClure; Lois Jean Howe McClure (1989). Mementos. Burlington, Vt.: Lane Press. OCLC 40463808.
- The J. Warren McClure Journal : 1919 and Ongoing. Burlington, Vt.?: [publisher not identified]. 1996. OCLC 38826374.
