= Ruth Spencer Aspden =

British artist

- Born: 30 October 1909
- Died: 2004 (aged 94–95)
- Education: Blackburn School of Art; Royal College of Art
- Known for: Painting, etching

Ruth Spencer Aspden (30 October 1909–2004), later Ruth Rutter, was a British artist known for her paintings and etchings.

== Biography ==
Aspden attended the Blackburn School of Art from 1927 to 1933 after which she studied at the Royal College of Art in London until 1937. That year she was elected an associate member of the Royal Society of Painter-Etchers and Engravers. During World War II, Aspden worked on camouflage designs for the British government. She went on to exhibit regularly in London, where she lived, at the Royal Academy and the Royal Society of Painter-Ethchers and Engravers, elsewhere in England and in North America. Blackburn Museum and Art Gallery and the Smithsonian American Art Museum both hold examples of her work.
