= Tommy Aspden =

English footballer (1880–1959)

Personal information
- Full name: Thomas Eccles Aspden
- Date of birth: 27 December 1880
- Place of birth: Liverpool, England
- Date of death: 17 February 1959 (aged 78)
- Place of death: Fleetwood, England
- Height: 5 ft 8 3/4 in (1.75 m)
- Position: Winger

Senior career*
Years	Team	Apps	(Gls)
190?–1902	Preston North End	0	(0)
1902–1903	Kettering		
1903–1904	Burnley	29	(4)
1904–1905	Brighton & Hove Albion	7	(0)
1905–1906	Oldham Athletic		
- * Club domestic league appearances and goals

Thomas Eccles Aspden (27 December 1880 – 17 February 1959) was an English professional footballer who played as a winger in the Football League for Burnley. He was on the books of Preston North End without appearing for their first team, played Southern League football for Kettering and Brighton & Hove Albion, and was briefly attached to Oldham Athletic.

== Life and career ==
Aspden was born in 1880 in Liverpool, the son of Robert Aspden, a train driver, and his wife Sarah. By the time of the 1891 Census, his father had died, and the family were living in Preston, Lancashire, where his mother was landlady of the Cross Keys pub.

Aspden was on the books of Preston North End by November 1899. He played for their Lancashire Combination team, but did not always impress, but none for the first team, and joined Southern League club Kettering in June 1902. He played for Kettering for a season and then, amid interest from other Southern League clubs, returned to Lancashire to sign for Football League Second Division club Burnley in August 1903.

He made his Burnley debut in the opening game of the 1903–04 season, a goalless draw with Chesterfield on 5 September 1903, appeared in each of the first eight matches of the season, and scored his first goal for the club on 3 October in a 2–0 win over Grimsby Town. He then spent the next four matches out of the Burnley side, his place in the starting line-up taken by Jimmy Hogan. He returned to the team for the 3–1 loss to Lincoln City on 19 December and from then on missed only one game in the remainder of the season. On 23 January 1904, Aspden scored both goals in the 2–1 win against Preston North End at Turf Moor. He ended the season with four goals in 29 league appearances but left Burnley in the summer of 1904 to join Brighton & Hove Albion of the Southern League.

Aspden played seven Southern League matches for Brighton before damaging a knee during a match in October. After specialist surgery to repair a displaced cartilage, he was able to resume playing reserve-team football by the following March. He returned north, and in October 1905 joined Oldham Athletic of the Lancashire Combination, with whom he ended his career.

The 1911 Census finds Aspden, his wife, Emily née Cookson, their two young children and a boarder living in Accrington, where Aspden worked as a billiard manager. He was resident in Lytham St Annes at the time of his death in Rossall Hospital, Fleetwood, in 1959 at the age of 78.
