= Jack Green (footballer, born 1887) =

Australian rules footballer (1887–1963)

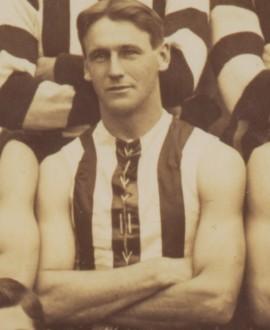
- Green in 1914

Personal information
- Full name: John William Green
- Born: 28 August 1887; Birregurra, Victoria
- Died: 6 May 1963 (aged 75); Kew East, Victoria
- Original team: Barwon Downs
- Debut: Round 6, 6 June 1908, Geelong vs. St Kilda, at Corio Oval
- Height: 175 cm (5 ft 9 in)
- Weight: 79 kg (174 lb)
- Position: half-back flank

Playing career^{1}
| Years | Club | Games (Goals) |
| 1908 | Geelong (VFL) | 2 (0) |
| 1911–1918 | Collingwood (VFL) | 108 (6) |
| 1919–1922 | Brighton (VFA) | 32 (2) |
| Total | | 142 (8) |
- ^{1} Playing statistics correct to the end of 1922.

Career highlights
- 1917 Premiership Team

John William Green (28 August 1887 – 6 May 1963) was an Australian rules footballer who played for the Geelong Football Club and the Collingwood Football Club in the Victorian Football League (VFL), and for the Brighton Football Club in the Victorian Football Association (VFA).

== Family ==
The son of Thomas Henry Green (1850-1925), and Jane Green (1859-1936), née Wilson, John William Green was born at Birregurra, Victoria, on 28 August 1887.

He married Jessie May Battle (1887–1959), in Collingwood, on 6 February 1915.

== "Jack Green" ==
John William Green is one of four Jack Green's to have played VFL/AFL football; the others are:

- John Joseph Patrick "Jack" Green (1905–1960), not a relative, who played 126 games with Carlton and Hawthorn from 1929 to 1936.
- Jack Taylor Green (1919–1981), his son, who played 127 games with Collingwood from 1938 to 1949.
- Jack William Green (1947-), his grandson, who played 18 games with Collingwood from 1967 to 1969.

== Football ==
=== Geelong (VFL) ===
Green played two games for Geelong in 1908.

=== Collingwood (VFL) ===
After two seasons out of the VFL, Green was granted a clearance from Geelong on 17 May 1911, and he went on to play for Collingwood from 1911 to 1918.

==== Grand Finals ====
Green played in four Grand Finals for Collingwood: the 6 point loss to Essendon in 1911, the 33 point loss to Carlton in 1915, the 35 point win over Fitzroy in 1917, and the 5 point loss to South Melbourne in 1918.

=== Brighton (VFA) ===
In 1919 he was appointed captain-coach of Brighton in the VFA.

== Death ==
He died at Kew East, Victoria on 6 May 1963.

== See also ==
- 1914 Sydney Carnival
