= Pete Fitzpatrick =

Canadian soccer player

Pete "Larry" Fitzpatrick
Personal information
- Full name: Peter Laurence Fitzpatrick
- Date of death: May 17, 1946
- Position: Forward

Senior career*
Years	Team	Apps	(Gls)
1928–1929	Providence Gold Bugs	81	(17)
1929–1930	Pawtucket Rangers	10	(3)
- * Club domestic league appearances and goals

Peter Laurence "Larry" Fitzpatrick was a Canadian soccer player that played in Canada and the United States.

== Career ==
Fitzpatrick won back-to-back Dominion of Canada Football Championships with Verdun Park FC and Montreal Aldred in 1934 and 1935. He also played three years in the first American Soccer League. He played 81 league games for the Providence Gold Bugs in 1928 and 1929. He began the 1929–1930 season in Providence, but transferred to the Pawtucket Rangers after only sixteen games. On May 18, 1929, he scored one of the two Gold Bugs’ goals in a 2–2 tie with the New York Nationals in the 1929 American Cup. The Gold Bugs went on to win the cup with a 4-2 replay victory. He also played for Montreal Blue Bonnets and Montreal CPR Glen Yards in Canada. In 2017, as part of the "Legends Class" he was elected to the Canada Soccer Hall of Fame as a player.
