= Walter Aspden =

American soccer player

Personal information
- Date of birth: November 26, 1907
- Place of birth: Massachusetts, United States
- Date of death: May 1987 (aged 79)
- Place of death: United States
- Position: Inside forward

Senior career*
Years	Team	Apps	(Gls)
1927	Newark Skeeters	2	(0)
1927–1929	New Bedford Whalers	44	(1)
1929	Pawtucket Rangers	2	(0)
1930	New York Giants	1	(1)
1930–1931	New Bedford Whalers	26	(0)
1931	Boston	19	(0)
- New Bedford Defenders
- * Club domestic league appearances and goals

Walter Aspden (1907–1987) was an American soccer inside forward who played professionally in the first American Soccer League.

Aspden won the 1926 National Amateur Cup with the New Bedford Defenders.

Aspden signed with the Newark Skeeters during the 1927-1928 American Soccer League season, but moved to the New Bedford Whalers after playing only one game for the Skeeters. On June 9, 1929, he scored one of three Whalers goals in the defeat of the Fall River F.C. in the ASL playoff semifinals. By the fall of 1929, the American Soccer League was beginning its collapse and Aspden jumped from team to team, seeing games with four teams between the fall of 1929 and the fall of 1931. In December 1933, he is listed with the amateur New Bedford Defenders.
