= Hartford Americans =

American soccer club (1927–1928)

The Hartford Americans was an American soccer club based in Hartford, Connecticut that was member of the professional American Soccer League. They joined the league in 1927, but were dropped early in the season to balance the league after the Philadelphia Celtic was suspended after only 10 games.

== Year-by-year ==
Year	Division	League	Reg. season	Playoffs	U.S. Open Cup
1927–28	1	ASL	11th (First half)	No playoff	Did not enter
