= Bobby Blair (footballer) =

Scottish footballer

Personal information
- Place of birth: Helensburgh, Scotland
- Position: Center forward

Senior career*
Years	Team	Apps	(Gls)
1923–1924	Morton	4	(2)
1924–1925	Helensburgh	30	(32)
1925–1927	Boston Soccer Club	113	(91)
1928–1929	Fall River	36	(21)
1929	J&P Coats	15	(5)
1929	Boston Soccer Club	4	(2)
1929	New Bedford Whalers	19	(8)
- * Club domestic league appearances and goals

Robert Blair was a Scottish association football center forward who spent most of his career in the American Soccer League.

Blair played for Helensburgh which competed in Scottish Football League Division Three. In 1925, Blair left Scotland to sign with the Boston Soccer Club of the American Soccer League, although he was still under contract to Helensburgh. When Blair arrived, he quickly established himself as a prolific goalscorer. During the 1925–26 season, he scored thirty-six goals in thirty-three games, putting him third on the scoring chart. His form continued the next season when he averaged a goal a game. In 1927, he began the season with Boston, but moved to the Fall River after nine games. In 1928, he again began the season with one team, the 'Marksmen', but then played for two more: J&P Coats and Boston again. In 1929, he finished his professional career with the New Bedford Whalers which competed part of the season in the ASL and part in the Eastern Professional Soccer League.
