= Sam Kennedy (footballer, born 1899) =

Scottish footballer

Personal information
- Date of birth: 1899
- Place of birth: Glasgow, Scotland
- Position: Forward

Senior career*
Years	Team	Apps	(Gls)
1925	Falkirk	11	(5)
1925–1926	Clyde	24	(24)
1926–1927	Fall River	26	(12)
1927–1928	J&P Coats	48	(16)
1928–1929	New Bedford Whalers	12	(10)
1929–1931	Pawtucket Rangers	43	(2)
- * Club domestic league appearances and goals

Sam Kennedy (1899-?) was a Scottish association football forward who played in Scotland and the American Soccer League.

Following spells with Falkirk and Clyde in Scotland, in 1926 Kennedy signed with the Fall River of the American Soccer League, after Fall River center forward Harold Brittan moved to the New Bedford Whalers. In December, he briefly returned to Scotland when his young son became ill. In 1927, Kennedy began the season with Fall River, played one game, then was transferred to J&P Coats. In 1928, he was again transferred during the season, this time to the New Bedford Whalers. Despite the changes in team, he scored twenty-three goals (thirteen with Coats and ten with New Bedford), placing him sixth on the goals list. In 1929, he was back with J&P Coats, now known as the Pawtucket Rangers under new ownership. He played for the Rangers until 1931.
