= Jimmy McClure =

American soccer player

Personal information
- Position: Outside right

Senior career*
Years	Team	Apps	(Gls)
1923–1925	Philadelphia	55	(5)
1925–1926	Indiana Flooring	21	(1)
1926–1927	Philadelphia	32	(11)
1927–1928	Providence	26	(5)
1928–1929	Bethlehem Steel	2	(0)
1929	Philadelphia	32	(6)
1929	Brooklyn Wanderers	11	(3)
Total		179	(31)
- * Club domestic league appearances and goals

Jimmy McClure was an early twentieth-century soccer outside right who spent five seasons in the American Soccer League.

Beginning in 1924 with Philadelphia Field Club, McClure spent five seasons in the American Soccer League with five teams. His best season came in 1926-1927 when he scored eleven goals in thirty-two games for Philadelphia.
