= Tom Gillespie =

Scottish footballer

Personal information
- Full name: Thomas Bennett Gillespie
- Date of birth: 28 February 1901
- Place of birth: Girvan, Scotland
- Date of death: 1975 (aged 73–74)
- Place of death: Glasgow, Scotland
- Position: Forward

Senior career*
Years	Team	Apps	(Gls)
1922–1925	Queen of the South	45	(10)
1923–1924	→ Hamilton Academical (loan)	20	(1)
1925–1926	Preston North End	23	(3)
1926–1930	Bethlehem Steel	137	(83)
1930–1931	Newark Skeeters	31	(7)
1931–1932	Preston North End	4	(0)
1933	Montrose	12	(5)
1933	St Mirren	1	(0)
1934–1935	Montrose	14	(5)
- * Club domestic league appearances and goals

Thomas Bennett Gillespie (28 February 1901 – 1975) was a Scottish footballer who played professionally as a forward in Scotland, England and the United States.

== Career ==
Gillespie began his career with Dumfries club Queen of the South in his native Scotland. He spent time with Hamilton Academical before moving south to Preston North End in 1925.

In the summer of 1926, Gillespie left Britain to join Bethlehem Steel of the American Soccer League. He became a surprising goal scoring threat. During his first season in the ASL, he scored thirty-three league goals and four cup goals in thirty-two league and four cup games. His goal scoring prowess decreased in his second season as he gained only twenty-eight goals in forty-three league games, plus another three goals in nine cup games. But that still put him third on the league goals table. During the 1928–1929 season, the league expelled Bethlehem Steel during the 'Soccer War'. Before their expulsion, Gillespie had scored two goals in six league games. Bethlehem Steel then joined the Eastern Soccer League where Gillespie thirteen goals in the first half of the season. However, he scored only four goals in the second half of the season. From this point on, he was no longer a goal scoring threat. When Bethlehem Steel returned to the ASL, Gillespie's goal production dipped to four in twenty-three games. In 1930, Bethlehem Steel Company withdrew their team from the league and disbanded it after suffering significant financial losses. Gillespie moved to the Newark Skeeters for one season before returning to Preston North End where he played four games during the 1931–1932 season. After moving back to Scotland with Montrose in 1933, good form prompted St Mirren to sign him; however, that contract was cancelled within a few months and he reverted to Montrose for another year before retiring.
