= John Nelson (soccer, born 1905) =

Scottish American footballer (1905-1984)

Personal information
- Date of birth: February 27, 1905
- Place of birth: Johnstone, Scotland
- Date of death: November 30, 1984 (aged 79)
- Place of death: Yonkers, New York, U.S.
- Position: Center forward

Senior career*
Years	Team	Apps	(Gls)
- Yonkers Thistle
1923–1928	Brooklyn Wanderers	126	(101)
1928	Fall River	14	(10)
1928–1929	J&P Coats	12	(7)
1929–1930	New York Nationals	82	(93)
1930–1931	→ New York Giants	16	(12)
- * Club domestic league appearances and goals

Johnny Nelson (February 27, 1905 – November 30, 1984) was a Scottish American soccer center forward who ended his career as the second leading scorer in the history of the first American Soccer League. He was posthumously inducted into the National Soccer Hall of Fame in 2005.

== Professional career ==
At some point as a teenager, Nelson joined the semi-professional Yonkers Thistle of the New York State League. In the spring of 1924, he signed with the Brooklyn Wanderers of the American Soccer League. He played only four games, scoring one goal. While these numbers give little indication of his goal scoring prowess, his first full season in the league showed his full worth. He stormed to fifth place on the goals table with twenty-four in thirty-three games. Before Brooklyn traded him to the Fall River for George Graham in March 1928, he scored 101 goals for the team. Nelson played only eleven games at the end of the 1927–1928 season and another three at the start of the 1928–1929 season in Fall River before he jumped to J&P Coats for twelve games. He then moved to the New York Nationals for the end of the season. On May 18, 1929, Nelson scored two goals for the Nationals in a 2–2 tie with the Providence Clamdiggers in the final of the 1929 American Cup. The Nationals won the rematch two days later. Nelson remained with the Nationals, renamed the New York Giants in 1930, until an April 5, 1931 knee injury ended his career.

== Post soccer career ==
With his career over at age twenty-six, Nelson spent the next thirty years designing carpets for Alexander Smith and Sons Carpet Company of New York City.

== National Soccer Hall of Fame ==
The U.S. National Soccer Hall of Fame inducted Nelson in 2005 as part of a process of recognizing significant pre-1950s players. According to the Hall of Fame, "We were aware that in the early decades of the Hall of Fame a number of outstanding players had slipped through the cracks of the selection process. In order to correct these oversights we established a Blue Ribbon panel consisting of historians Colin Jose, Roger Allaway and Hall of Famer Walter Bahr, to review the credentials of all Veterans from the pre-NASL era. Out of a total of 150 players who met the eligibility criteria, the panel unanimously recommended, and the Board approved, the special induction of these five players." Nelson was among the five selected.
