= Johnny Ballantyne =

Scottish footballer

- Ballantyne in 1935 on LCC trading card

Personal information
- Date of birth: 27 October 1899
- Place of birth: Glasgow, Scotland
- Date of death: 1977 (aged 77–78)
- Place of death: Glasgow, Scotland
- Height: 5 ft 9 in (1.75 m)
- Position: Inside forward

Senior career*
Years	Team	Apps	(Gls)
- Ashfield
1921–1924	Partick Thistle	72	(13)
1924–1928	Boston Soccer Club	146	(50)
1929–1935	Partick Thistle	199	(52)
1935	→ Falkirk (loan)	4	(0)
1935–1937	Queens Park Rangers	25	(3)

International career
1930	Scottish League XI	1	(0)
- * Club domestic league appearances and goals

John Ballantyne (27 October 1899 – 1977) was a Scottish footballer who played professionally as an inside forward in Scotland, England and the United States.

Born in Glasgow, Ballantyne began his senior career with Partick Thistle in 1921 after time in the junior leagues with Ashfield. In 1924, after signing a new one-season contract with Thistle including a signing bonus, he moved to the United States where he signed with the Boston Soccer Club of the American Soccer League. This nearly led to the suspension of the United States Football Association, an action prevented by stronger agreements between FIFA member associations on player transfer rules.

Ballantyne spent four seasons with Boston before returning to Thistle in 1929. He stayed with the Jags (featuring on the losing side in the replayed 1930 Scottish Cup Final) until 1935 at which point he was briefly loaned to Falkirk, before moving to Queens Park Rangers. He finished his career with the West London club in 1937.

His younger brothers Willie a.k.a. 'Red' and Bobby were also footballers who featured for clubs in Scotland and the United States.
