= Springfield Babes =

The Springfield Babes was an American soccer club based in Springfield, Massachusetts that was a member of the American Soccer League. The club folded during its only season in the ASL, stopping play in December 1926 with 17 games still to play.

== Year-by-year ==
Year	Division	League	Reg. season	Playoffs	U.S. Open Cup
1926–27	1	ASL	12th	No playoff	?
