= Holley Carburetor F.C. =

Holley Carburetor F.C. was a U.S. soccer team sponsored by The Holley Brothers Company of Detroit, Michigan. The team went to the final of the 1927 National Challenge Cup where it fell 7–0 to the Fall River F.C. Over the next two years, it was eliminated early in the cup, but in 1930, it gained the quarterfinals before falling to Cleveland Bruell Insurance. Notable Holley Carburetor players include National Soccer Hall of Fame member Alex Wood, Canada Soccer Hall of Fame member Bobby Lavery and the Dutch international and Olympics participant Gerrit Visser.

== Honors ==
- National Challenge Cup
  - Finalist 1927
- Detroit Major League
  - Champions 1927-28

== Sources ==
Detroit Free Press
