= Bricklayers and Masons F.C. =

U.S. soccer team

Bricklayers and Masons F.C., also known as Chicago Bricklayers, was a U.S. soccer team based in Chicago, Illinois which joined that city's Association Football League in 1914. Over the next twenty years, Bricklayers won two Peel Cups and was the runner up in the 1928 and 1931 National Challenge Cup.

== History ==
In 1914, Bricklayers joined the Association Football League of Chicago. According to Dave Litterer, “the ALFC [sic] welcomed one of the major regional powers to its ranks - the Bricklayers”. At some point, Bricklayers jumped to the Illinois State Football Association League, winning the 1917-1918 championship. In 1920, Bricklayers was in the Chicago and District Soccer League, better known as the Chicago Soccer League. Bricklayers won the 1921 CSL championship. In the late 1920s and early 1930s, Bricklayers competed in the Chicago Building Trades League. The team continued to compete until 1947 when it folded.

== Year-by-year ==
Year	League	Reg. season	Peel Cup	National Challenge Cup
1914/15	AFL	2nd	?	Second round
1915/16	?	?	?	?
1916/17	?	?	?	Second round
1917/18	ISFAL	1st	Runner Up	First round
1918/19	?	?	?	Semifinal
1919/20	?	?	Champion	Fourth round
1920/21	CSL	1st	Runner Up	Quarterfinal
1921/22	?	?	?	Third round
1922/23	?	?	?	Quarterfinal
1923/24	?	?	Champion	Semifinal
1924/25	?	?	?	Third round
1925/26	?	?	?	Second round
1926/27	?	?	?	Second round
1927/28	?	?	?	Runner Up
1928/29	?	?	?	Quarterfinal
1929/30	?	?	?	Quarterfinal
1930/31	?	?	?	Runner Up
1931/32	?	?	?	Semifinal
1932/33	?	?	?	First round

== Honors ==
National Challenge Cup

- Runner Up (2): 1928, 1931

Peel Cup

- Winner (2): 1920, 1924
- Runner Up (2): 1918, 1921

League Championship

- Winner (2): 1918, 1921
- Runner Up (1): 1915
