= Boston Soccer Club =

Historic American soccer club in the 1920s

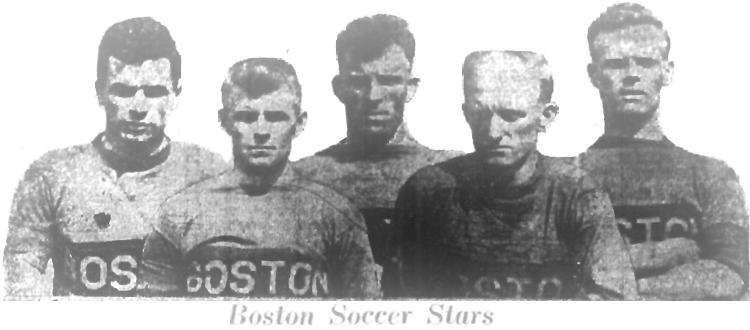
J.Ballantyne, McNab, McArthur, T.Fleming, McMilan

The Boston Soccer Club was a member of the American Soccer League. They were renamed the Boston Bears for the Fall 1929 ASL season.

In 1925, the ASL and the St. Louis Soccer League (SLSL) boycotted the National Challenge Cup, now known as the U.S. Open Cup. The "Wonder Workers" or "Woodsies" (after team president G. A. G. Wood), as they were dubbed, had won the 1925 league cup, known as the Lewis Cup. That victory qualified them for the one time American Professional Soccer Championship pitting them against the Ben Millers, the top team in the St. Louis Soccer League. The 'Wonder Workers' defeated the Ben Millers in three games. The 'Wonder Workers' won the Lewis Cup again in 1927.

After the 1925/26 ASL season the 'Wonder Workers', the Brooklyn Wanderers and the New Bedford Whalers joined with four top Canadian clubs to form the one-off International Soccer League held that summer and early fall.

== Year-by-year ==
Year	Division	League	Reg. season	Playoffs	National Cup
1924/25	1	ASL	4th	No playoff	Did not enter
1925/26	1	ASL	3rd	No playoff	Third round
1926	N/A	ISL	2nd	No playoff	N/A
1926/27	1	ASL	2nd	No playoff	First round
1927/28	1	ASL	1st (1st half); 5th (2nd half)	Champion	Second round
1928/29	1	ASL	6th (1st half); 7th (2nd half)	No playoff	Did not enter
