= József Eisenhoffer =

Hungarian footballer (1900–1945)

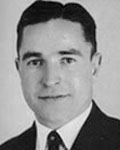

Personal information
- Date of birth: 8 November 1900
- Place of birth: Budapest, Hungary
- Date of death: 13 February 1945 (aged 44)
- Positions: Inside left; outside left; left half

Youth career
- 1912–1917: Budapest TC

Senior career*
Years	Team	Apps	(Gls)
1917–1920	Kispest A.C.		
1920–1924	Ferencvárosi		
1923–1924	→ Makkabi des Brno (loan)		
1924–1926	Hakoah Vienna		
1926–1928	Brooklyn Wanderers	90	(32)
1928–1929	New York Hakoah		
1929	Brooklyn Hakoah	5	(3)
1929–1931	Brooklyn Wanderers	66	(16)
1931–1933	Hakoah Vienna	67	(21)
1932–1936	Marseille	58	(19)
1939–1941	Marseille	8	(2)

International career
1920–1924	Hungary	8	(7)

Managerial career
- 1935–1938: Marseille
- 1938: Lens
- 1938–1941: Marseille
- * Club domestic league appearances and goals

József Eisenhoffer (8 November 1900 – 13 February 1945), also known as József Aczél, was a Hungarian footballer. He could play equally well as an inside or outside left as well as left half. Eisenhoffer played professionally in Hungary, Austria, France and the United States. He also managed Olympique de Marseille for six seasons and earned eight caps with the Hungary national team. He was a member of the 1924 Hungarian Olympic football team.

== Club career ==
Eisenhoffer was born in Budapest, Hungary. A convert to Judaism, he began his football career when he signed with Budapest TC in 1912. He was twelve at the time. In 1917, he moved to Kispest A.C. where he played three seasons. In 1920, he transferred to Ferencvárosi where he played until 1924, with a loan to Makkabi des Brno during the 1923–1924 season. In 1924, he transferred to the prominent Austrian Jewish club Hakoah Vienna.

In 1926, Hakoah toured the United States. Several players were impressed by both the relatively high pay and low anti-Semitism there. Consequently, several, including Eisenhoffer, remained in the U.S. and signed with local clubs. In June 1926, Nat Agar, owner of the American Soccer League’s Brooklyn Wanderers, signed Eisenhoffer. He would play for most of five seasons, except for five games in 1929.

In 1928, the ASL initiated a struggle with the United States Soccer Federation for control of football in the U.S. This conflict, known as the "Soccer War" led to the USFA declaring the ASL an "outlaw league". When that happened, Eisenhoffer had already played eight games in the 1928–1929 season, but then jumped to the New York Hakoah of the fully recognized Eastern Professional Soccer League. New York Hakoah won the 1929 National Challenge Cup with Eisenhoffer scoring one goal in the first leg victory over St. Louis Madison Kennel. When the ASL made peace with USFA in 1929, New York Hakoah entered the ASL.

Eisenhoffer now found himself back in a league he had fled and with a contract still in force with the Wanderers. Agar promptly sued Eisenoffer for breach of contract. In the meantime, Eisenhoffer played five games with Hokoah in the ASL. In December 1929, the suit was withdrawn and Eisenhoffer was fined $500 and allowed to return to the Wanderers. This internecine battle ultimately destroyed the ASL and in 1931, it collapsed.

Eisenhoffer left the U.S. and returned to Austria where he signed with Hakoah Vienna. In 1933, Vienna sent him to French Ligue 1 club Olympique de Marseille where he finished his career. Eisenhoffer experienced considerable success with Olympique, going to the 1934, 1935 and 1940 French Cup. While Olympique lost in 1934, it won the next year.

In 1935, Eisenhoffer became the team's manager as well as a player and took Olympique to the 1936–1937 league title. He also managed RC Lens briefly in 1938 before returning to Olympique. He finished his career with one game with Olympique during the 1940–1941 season. In 1944, he was wounded during a Soviet air raid on Budapest. His wound was not treated and eventually led to his death.

== International career ==
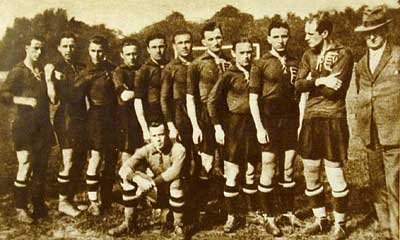
1924 Maygar team; Károly Fogl, Zoltán Opata, Ferenc Hirzer, Rudolf Jeny, József Eisenhoffer, Béla Guttmann, Gyula Mándi, Gábor Obitz, József Braun, György Orth, János Biri, and Gyula Kiss

Eisenhoffer earned eight caps with the Hungarian national team between 1920 and 1924. In 1924, he was a member of the Hungarian Olympic Team. He played two first-round games, scoring one goal in Hungary's win over Poland.
