= Béla Guttmann =

Hungarian football player and manager (1899–1981)

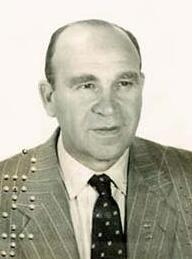
- Guttmann in 1953

Personal information
- Full name: Béla Guttmann
- Date of birth: 27 January 1899
- Place of birth: Budapest, Austria-Hungary
- Date of death: 28 August 1981 (aged 82)
- Place of death: Vienna, Austria
- Position: Centre-half

Youth career
- 1917–1919: Törekvés SE

Senior career*
Years	Team	Apps	(Gls)
1919–1920	Törekvés SE	17	(0)
1921–1922	MTK Hungária	16	(1)
1922–1926	Hakoah Wien	96	(8)
1926	Brooklyn Wanderers		
1926–1929	New York Giants	83	(2)
1929–1930	New York Hakoah	21	(0)
1930	New York Soccer Club	22	(0)
1931–1932	Hakoah All-Stars	50	(0)
1932–1933	Hakoah Wien	4	(0)

International career
1921–1924	Hungary	4	(1)

Managerial career
- 1933–1935: Hakoah Wien
- 1935–1937: Enschede
- 1937–1938: Hakoah Wien
- 1938–1939: Újpest
- 1945: Vasas
- 1946: Ciocanul București
- 1947: Újpest
- 1947–1948: Kispest
- 1949–1950: Padova
- 1950–1951: Triestina
- 1953: Quilmes
- 1953: APOEL
- 1953–1955: Milan
- 1955–1956: Vicenza
- 1956–1957: Honvéd
- 1957–1958: São Paulo
- 1958–1959: Porto
- 1959–1962: Benfica
- 1962: Peñarol
- 1964: Austria
- 1965–1966: Benfica
- 1966–1967: Servette
- 1967: Panathinaikos
- 1973: Austria Wien
- 1973–1974: Porto
- * Club domestic league appearances and goals

Béla Guttmann (Hungarian: [ˈbeːlɒ ˈɡutmɒnn]; 27 January 1899 – 28 August 1981) was a Hungarian footballer and coach, most famously remembered for his managerial stints at S.L. Benfica. Before the war, he played as a midfielder for MTK Hungária, Hakoah Vienna, and several clubs in the United States. Guttmann also played for the Hungary national team, including at the 1924 Olympic Games. During the occupation of Hungary by the Wehrmacht, Guttmann, who was Jewish, was deported to a Nazi slave labor camp where he was tortured, though he ultimately survived the Holocaust.

Guttmann coached in ten countries from 1933 to 1974, and won ten national championships and two consecutive European Cups with Benfica. He also coached the national teams of Hungary and Austria, having also coached club football in the Netherlands, Italy, Brazil, Uruguay, and Portugal. He is perhaps best remembered as a coach and manager after the war of AC Milan, São Paulo, Porto, Benfica and Peñarol. His greatest success came with Benfica when he guided them to two successive European Cup wins, in 1961 and in 1962.

Guttmann pioneered the 4–2–4 formation along with Márton Bukovi and Gusztáv Sebes, forming a triumvirate of radical Hungarian coaches, and is also credited with mentoring young Eusébio at Benfica. Throughout his career, he was never far from controversy. Widely travelled, as both a player and coach, he rarely stayed at a club longer than two seasons, and was quoted as saying "the third season is fatal". He was sacked by Milan while they were top of Serie A, and he walked out on Benfica after they reportedly refused a request for a pay rise, leaving the club with a "curse".

== Early life ==
Guttmann was born in Budapest, Austria-Hungary, and was Jewish. His parents, Ábrahám and Eszter were dance teachers. He became a trained dance instructor himself, at 16 years of age. He obtained a Psychology degree in Austria.

== Playing career ==
=== Club career ===
Guttmann was a prominent member of the MTK Hungária team of the early 1920s. Playing halfback or center half alongside Gyula Mándi, he helped MTK win Hungarian League titles in 1920 and 1921.

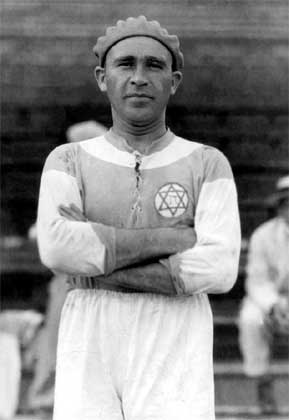
Guttmann during his Hakoah Wien period in 1925

In 1922, Guttmann moved to Vienna, Austria, to escape the antisemitism in Hungary of the Admiral Horthy regime, as during 1919 to 1921 counter-revolutionary soldiers carried out repressive violence to destroy any supporters of Hungary's short-lived Soviet republic and its Red Terror. Several hundreds of people were killed, many of them were Jewish in a campaign known as the White Terror, orchestrated by the Hungarian nationalist government. In Vienna he joined the all-Jewish club Hakoah Wien and played for them as their centre back from 1922 to 1926 and in 1933. For the team's shirts, they wore the blue and white of the Zionist national movement, and a large Star of David was their badge. In 1925, he won another league title when Hakoah won the Austrian League. In April 1926, the Hakoah Wien squad sailed to New York to begin a ten-match tour of the United States. On 1 May, a crowd of 46,000 watched them play an American Soccer League XI at the Polo Grounds, a US record for a soccer game until 1977. The ASL team won 3–0. At least six of the Hakoah players were later killed in the Holocaust.

Following the tour Guttmann, who was Hakoah's most prominent player, and several of his teammates decided to stay on in the US. After initially playing for Brooklyn Wanderers, he signed for the New York Giants of the American Soccer League (ASL), playing 83 games and scoring two goals over two seasons. In 1928, the Giants were suspended from the ASL as part of the "Soccer War", a dispute pitting the ASL and United States Soccer Federation.

Guttmann and the Giants joined the Eastern Soccer League, but he soon moved to New York Hakoah, a team made-up of former Hakoah Wien players, including Rudolph Nickolsburger. In 1929, he helped them win the US Open Cup (then known as National Challenge Cup). After a merger with Brooklyn Hakoah, they became the Hakoah All-Stars in 1930. In the fall of 1930, Guttmann rejoined the Giants, now known as the New York Soccer Club, but was back at the All-Stars in the spring of 1931 where he finished his career as a player. When he retired as a player he was 32 years old, and had played 176 ASL games. As well as playing football, while in New York, Guttmann also taught dance, bought into a speakeasy, invested in the stock market, and almost lost everything after the Wall Street crash of 1929.

=== Hungarian international ===
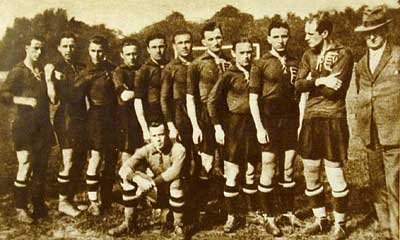
1924 national team: Károly Fogl, Zoltán Opata, Ferenc Hirzer, Rudolf Jeny, József Eisenhoffer, Béla Guttmann, Gyula Mándi, Gábor Obitz, József Braun, György Orth, János Biri, and Gyula Kiss

Between 1921 and 1924, Guttmann played six times for the Hungary national football team, scoring on his debut on 5 June 1921 in a 3–0 win against Germany. Later in the same month, he also played against a Southern Germany XI. His remaining four appearances all came in May 1924 in games against Switzerland, Saarland, Poland, and Egypt. The latter two were at the 1924 Olympic Games in Paris. During the preparations for the competition Guttmann objected to the fact that there were more officials than players in the Hungary squad. He also complained that the hotel was more suitable for socialising than match preparation, and to demonstrate his disapproval he hung dead rats on the doors of the travelling officials.

== Coaching career ==
Guttmann coached two dozen teams in ten countries, from 1933 to 1974, and won two European Cups, and ten national championships. He also coached the national teams of Hungary, Austria, the Netherlands, Italy, Brazil, Uruguay, and Portugal. As a coach, tactically he pioneered the 4–2–4 formation, and had his teams play fearless attacking football. In addition, he required that his players follow his regime of diet, rigorous fitness, and hard training.

=== Return to Europe; Nazi forced labor camp ===
Guttmann returned to Europe in 1932 and in the years before the outbreak of the Second World War he coached teams in Austria, The Netherlands, and Hungary. He had spells with his former club Hakoah Wien, and then Dutch side Enschede. He then had his first serious success with Újpest in the 1938–39 season, winning the Hungarian League and the Mitropa Cup (the precursor to the European Cup). Shortly thereafter, anti-Jewish laws introduced by the Hungarian government ensured Guttmann lost his job.

During the destruction of Hungarian Jewry, after the Nazis occupied Hungary in March 1944 and sent most of Hungary's Jews to Nazi concentration camps where they were killed, Guttmann initially hid in an attic in Újpest, aided by his non-Jewish brother-in-law. He was then sent to a Nazi forced labor camp near Budapest, where he was tortured. Years later, he reminisced: "Our sergeant ... [had] learned how to torture people... Was I a footballer from the national team, was I a successful coach? Was I even a man? Who cared, you had to forget all about it." He escaped in December 1944, just before he was about to be sent to Auschwitz concentration camp, together with Ernest Erbstein, another famous Jewish-Hungarian coach. His 78-year-old father Abraham, older sister Szeren, and wider family were murdered in Auschwitz. For many years the story of what happened to him during the Holocaust was unclear, until David Bolchover wrote about it in his biography of Guttman, titled The Greatest Comeback.

After the war, Guttmann briefly took charge at Budapest side Vasas from July 1945–1946. He then joined Ciocanul in Romania in 1946. Due to food shortages, Guttmann insisted his salary be paid in vegetables. He subsequently walked out on the Romanian club after a director attempted to intervene in team selection. German journalist Hardy Grune believed that he was frustrated with the corruption in the Romanian soccer world. Guttmann then in early 1947 rejoined Újpest, then known as Újpesti. He won another Hungarian League title. He then succeeded Ferenc Puskás Sr. as coach at Hungarian side Kispest. In November 1948, Guttmann attempted to take off fullback Mihály Patyi at whose ungentlemanly play he was furious, leaving the team with 10 players. Encouraged by the team captain, Ferenc Puskás Jr, Patyi remained on the pitch and Guttmann retired to the stands, reading a racing paper, refusing to coach the team, quitting on the spot. This was his final game in charge of the team, and he departed soon after the falling out.

=== Italy ===
Like many other Hungarian footballers and coaches, Guttmann spent time in Italy. He first coached for spells with Padova and Triestina. Guttmann was then appointed manager of AC Milan in 1953. With a team that included Gunnar Nordahl, Nils Liedholm, and Juan Alberto Schiaffino, Guttmann had them top of Serie A 19 games into his second season in charge, when a string of disputes with the board led to his dismissal. He later told a stunned press conference: "I have been sacked even though I am neither a criminal nor a homosexual. Goodbye." From then on he insisted on a clause in his contract that he could not be sacked if his team were top of the table. Shortly afterwards, he killed a teenager and injured another teenager in a car crash. He fled and was later sentenced leniently. He subsequently managed a fourth Italian club Vicenza.

=== South America ===
Guttmann first went to South America on tour with the Hakoah All-Stars in the summer of 1930. In 1957, he returned as a coach with the Kispest team which included Ferenc Puskás, Zoltán Czibor, Sándor Kocsis, József Bozsik, László Budai, Gyula Lóránt and Gyula Grosics. During a tour of Brazil, Kispest played a series of five games against CR Flamengo, Botafogo, and a Flamengo / Botafogo XI. Guttmann then stayed on in Brazil and took charge in 1957 of São Paulo and with a team that included Dino Sani, Mauro, and Zizinho, won the São Paulo State Championship in 1957. It was while in Brazil that he helped popularise the 4–2–4 formation, which had been pioneered by fellow countrymen Márton Bukovi and Gusztáv Sebes, and was subsequently used by Brazil as they won the 1958 FIFA World Cup. Before finally retiring as coach, Guttmann would return to South America to manage Peñarol in 1962; he was replaced in October by Peregrino Anselmo, who guided the side to the Uruguayan League title that very year.

=== Portugal ===
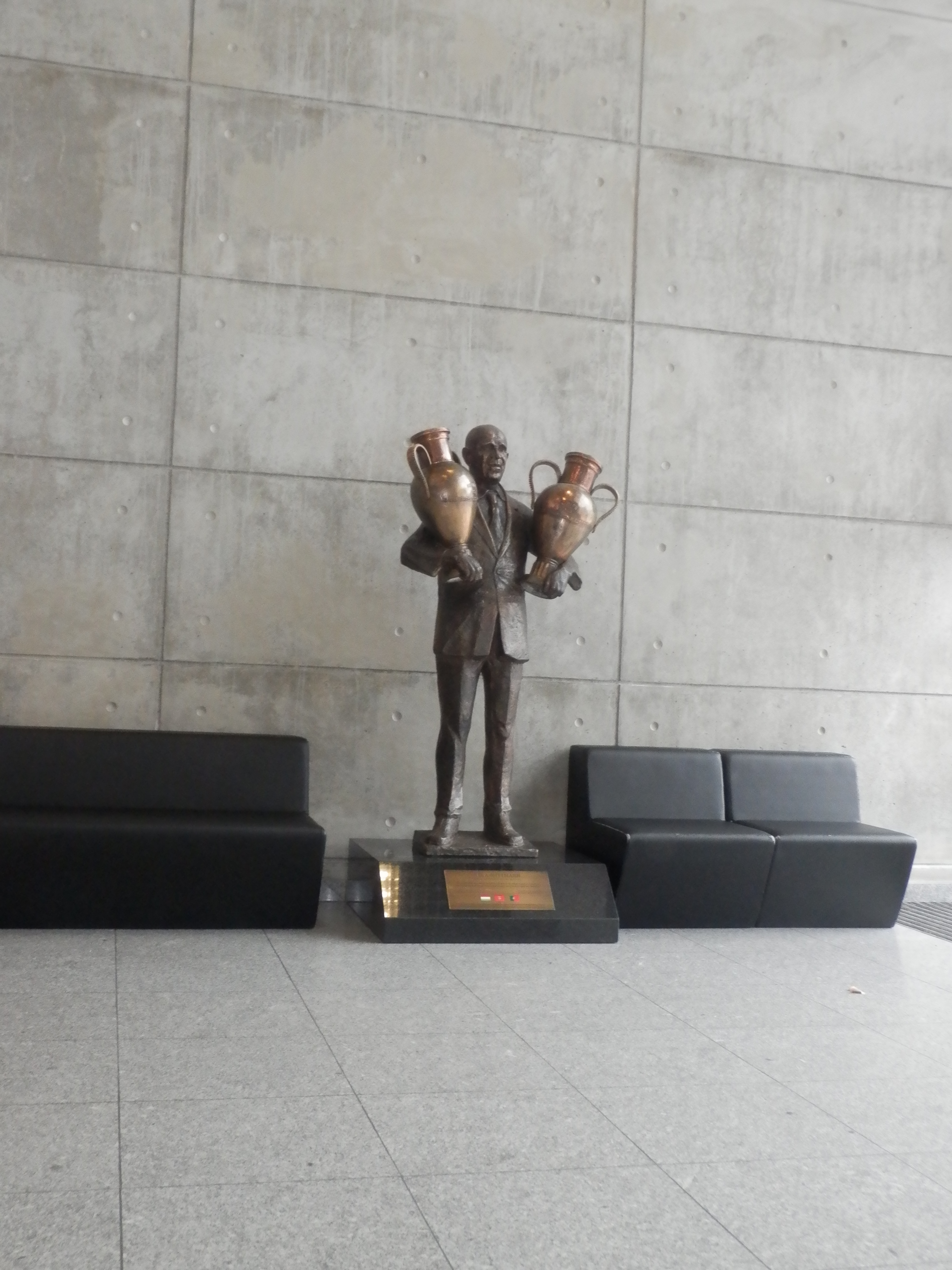
A statue of Guttmann holding a replica of the European Cup in each arm

In 1958, Guttmann arrived in Portugal and embarked on the most successful spell of his career. He took charge of Porto and helped them overhaul a five-point lead enjoyed by Benfica to win his first of three Portuguese League titles in 1959. The following season, he jumped ship and joined Lisbon side Benfica. There he promptly sacked 20 senior players, promoted a host of youth players, and won the league again in 1960 and 1961. Under Guttmann, Benfica, with a team that included Eusébio, José Águas, José Augusto, Costa Pereira, António Simões, Germano, and Mário Coluna, also won the European Cup twice in a row. In 1961, they beat Barcelona 3–2 in the final and in 1962 they retained the title, coming from 2 to 0 and 3–2 down to beat Real Madrid 5–3. After the game, he was held aloft by fans.

Legend has it that Guttmann signed Eusébio after a chance meeting in a barber shop. Seated next to Guttmann was José Carlos Bauer, one of his successors at São Paulo. The Brazilian team were on tour in Portugal, and the coach mentioned an outstanding player he had seen while they toured Mozambique. Eusébio had also attracted the interest of Sporting CP. Guttmann moved quickly and signed the then 19-year-old for Benfica. To celebrate Benfica's 110th birthday, a statue of Guttmann holding the two European Cups he won with the club was unveiled. The statue made by Hungarian sculptor László Szatmári Juhos was placed at door 18 of the Estádio da Luz.

=== "The curse of Béla Guttmann" ===
After the 1962 European Cup final, Guttmann reportedly approached the Benfica board of directors and asked for a pay rise. However, despite the success he had brought the club, he was turned down. On leaving Benfica, he allegedly cursed the club declaring "Not in a hundred years from now will Benfica ever be European champions again". Later, on 6 April 1963, in an interview to A Bola, he stated, "Benfica, at this moment, are well served and do not need me. They will win the Campeonato Nacional and will be champions of Europe again." Benfica went on to reach five European Cup finals (1963, 1965, 1968, 1988, and 1990) but did not win any. Before the 1990 final, played in Vienna, Eusébio reportedly prayed at Guttmann's grave and asked for the curse to be broken.

According to David Bolchover, in his biography of Guttmann, there is no documentary evidence on Guttmann saying anything related to a curse and that the first mention of such was in May 1988, by newspaper Gazeta dos Desportos, on the day Benfica played their sixth European final. The curse had its origins in March 1968 when A Bola published a loose and unsigned translation from German to Portuguese of an interview given by Guttmann to Sport-Illustrierte five months earlier, in October 1967. Moreover, in November 2011, Eusébio, who was coached by Guttmann, also denied the existence of the curse, calling it a "lie". In 2022, after losing three UEFA Youth League finals, Benfica's under-19 team became European youth champions by winning the 2021–22 edition, thus ending the superstition.

=== Managerial ===
Managerial record by team and tenure
Team	Country	From	To	Record				
Team	Country	From	To	G	W	D	L	Win %
Hakoah Vienna	(Austria)	16 June 1933	30 June 1935	50	15	12	23	30.00
SC Enschede	(Netherlands)	1 July 1935	30 June 1937	44	27	4	13	61.36
Hakoah Vienna	(Austria)	1 July 1937	14 March 1938	15	9	3	3	60.00
Újpest	(Hungary)	19 September 1938	10 August 1939	32	23	5	4	71.88
Vasas	(Hungary)	1 May 1945	31 December 1945	22	18	1	3	81.82
Újpest	(Hungary)	15 February 1947	16 August 1947	14	10	0	4	71.43
Kispest (Note: Later renamed to Budapest Honvéd.)	(Hungary)	16 August 1947	31 October 1948	39	29	4	6	74.36
Padova	(Italy)	1 July 1949	26 April 1950	33	10	8	15	30.30
Triestina	(Italy)	1 July 1950	19 November 1951	48	12	11	25	25.00
APOEL	(United Kingdom) (Cyprus)	26 September 1953	9 November 1953	2	1	0	1	50.00
AC Milan	(Italy)	9 November 1953	15 February 1955	44	25	11	8	56.82
Vicenza	(Italy)	1 July 1955	9 April 1956	26	7	9	10	26.92
Honved (Note: No official matches played after December 1956 due to Honved's refusal to compete in domestic competitions following the Hungarian Revolution of 1956.)	(Hungary)	1 August 1956	23 March 1957	9	6	1	2	66.67
São Paulo	(Brazil)	23 March 1957	17 July 1958	97	46	28	23	47.42
Porto	(Portugal)	2 November 1958	19 July 1959	28	21	4	3	75.00
Benfica	(Portugal)	20 July 1959	20 June 1962	124	89	20	15	71.77
Peñarol (Note: Only includes Copa Libertadores matches.)	(Uruguay)	20 June 1962	8 October 1962	6	2	1	3	33.33
Austria	(Austria)	12 April 1964	11 October 1964	5	3	1	1	60.00
Benfica	(Portugal)	1 July 1965	30 June 1966	38	25	7	6	65.79
Servette	(Switzerland)	1 October 1966	13 March 1967	16	8	4	4	50.00
Panathinaikos	(Greece)	6 August 1967	11 October 1967	3	1	0	2	33.33
Austria Wien	(Austria)	16 March 1973	1 August 1973	13	4	2	7	30.77
Porto	(Portugal)	1 August 1973	30 June 1974	34	21	7	6	61.76
Total				742	412	143	187	55.53

== Honours ==
=== Player ===
MTK Hungária

- Hungarian League: 1919–20, 1920–21

Hakoah Wien

- Austrian Champions: 1924–25

New York Hakoah

- National Challenge Cup: 1929

=== Manager ===
Újpest/Újpesti

- Hungarian League: 1938–39, 1946–47
- Mitropa Cup: 1939

São Paulo

- São Paulo State Champions: 1957

Porto

- Portuguese Liga: 1958–59

Benfica

- European Cup: 1960–61, 1961–62
- Primeira Divisão: 1959–60, 1960–61
- Taça de Portugal: 1961–62
- Intercontinental Cup runner-up: 1961

Peñarol

- Uruguayan Championship: 1962
- Copa Libertadores runner-up: 1962

=== Individual ===
- World Soccer 9th Greatest Manager of All Time: 2013
- ESPN 16th Greatest Manager of All Time: 2013
- France Football 20th Greatest Manager of All Time: 2019
- Deutsche Presse-Agentur 3rd Greatest Eastern European Manager of the 20th Century: 1999

== See also ==
- List of select Jewish footballers
- List of European Cup and UEFA Champions League winning managers
