= Ernő Schwarz =

Hungarian American soccer player, coach, and promoter

Ernö Schwarz
Personal information
- Date of birth: 7 March 1902
- Place of birth: Budapest, Hungary
- Date of death: 19 June 1977 (aged 75)
- Place of death: Queens, New York, United States
- Position: Wing Forward

Senior career*
Years	Team	Apps	(Gls)
1922–1923	Ferencváros		
1923	Makkabi Brno		
1923–1926	Hakoah Vienna		
1926–1928	New York Giants	77	(20)
1928–1929	New York Hakoah		
1929–1931	→ Hakoah All-Stars	56	(10)
1931–1936	New York Americans		

International career
1922	Hungary	2	(2)

Managerial career
- 1931–: New York Americans
- 1953–1955: United States
- 1957: New York Americans
- * Club domestic league appearances and goals

Ernő Schwarz or Schwarcz (7 March 1902 – 19 June 1977) was a Hungarian American soccer player, coach and promoter who served as head coach of the United States men's national soccer team. He played professionally in Hungary, Czechoslovakia, Austria and the United States, earning two caps, scoring two goals, with the Hungarian national team in 1922. Schwarz founded, owned, managed and played for the New York Americans in the first and second American Soccer Leagues. He was also the ASL and International Soccer League vice president. His daughter was married to United States national team player Ben Zinn.

== Player ==
Schwarz began his professional career as a forward for Ferencvárosi TC when he was seventeen. In 1922, Ferencvárosi won the Hungarian Cup. That fall, Schwarz moved to Czechoslovak club Makkabi Brünn. In November 1923, Makkabi played an exhibition game against SK Rapid Wien, crushing them 4-1 off two Schwarz goals. This brought him to the attention of Hakoah Vienna which signed him in December 1923. He went on to play twelve games, scoring nine goals, through the remainder of the 1923–1924 season. In the spring of 1926, Hakoah Vienna toured the United States. Impressed by the high pay and relatively minor anti-Semitism compared to Europe, Schwarz and several of his teammates decided to move to the U.S. following the conclusion of the tour. Before he did so, he returned to Austria where Hakoah won the league championship. Then in the summer of 1926, he left Europe for good to move to the United States. When he arrived, he signed with the New York Giants of the American Soccer League (ASL). In 1928, the ASL and United States Football Federation engaged in a struggle for dominance in the U.S. Known as the “Soccer War”, this struggle led to USFA and FIFA declaring the ASL an "outlaw league". When that happened, Schwarz signed for Rangers F.C., but was unable to join the club due to labor restrictions in Great Britain. After the Rangers deal fell through, Schwarz helped form New York Hakoah in the Eastern Professional Soccer League. Hakoah took third in the league, but ran away with the 1929 National Challenge Cup. Hakoah won both legs of the final over St. Louis Madison Kennel, with Schwarz scoring a goal in Hakoah's 3-0 second game victory. Following the end of the "Soccer War" in 1929, the ASL and ESL merged with New York Hakoah of the ESL merging with Brooklyn Hakoah of the ASL to form the Hakoah All-Stars. In 1931, Schwarz founded his own team, the New York Americans with whom he became both a player and coach. In 1933, Schwarz and his teammates lost to Stix, Baer and Fuller F.C. in the final of the 1933 National Challenge Cup. While the Americans defeated the St. Louis Shamrocks in the 1937 National Challenge Cup, Schwarz did not play in the final game as he had broken his leg in February 1937. After that, he played sporadically, but continued to play occasional games with the Americans until at least 1951.

=== National team ===
Schwarz earned two caps, scoring two goals, with the Hungarian national team. Both games came in July 1922, the first against Germany and the second a few days later against Finland. In that game, Schwarz scored two goals in a 5–1 victory. He never played for the national team again. On 19 May 1935, Schwarz played an unofficial international match for the United States men's national soccer team in a 5–1 loss to Scotland.

== Coach ==
=== Professional ===
When Schwarz founded the New York Americans in 1931, he installed himself as team coach, managing the team for more than two decades. At some point, he left coaching, but in 1956 returned as coach of the Americans

=== National team ===
In 1953, Schwarz was selected to coach the United States men's national soccer team from 1953 until 1955. During that time, he compiled a 2–4 record as the U.S. failed to qualify for the 1958 FIFA World Cup.

== Owner ==
In 1931, Schwarz founded the New York Americans, for which he was both the owner and player-manager. He guided the team through the last years of the ASL's existence, going to the final of the 1933 National Challenge Cup. That spring, the ASL collapsed and Schwarz was instrumental in the creation of a second American Soccer League which began playing in the fall of 1933. He continued to own the Americans for an unknown time after that.

== Executive ==
Following the collapse of the first American Soccer League in the spring of 1933, Schwarz became instrumental in the founding of the second league with that name. In the fall of 1933, the new league came into existence with Schwarz entering the Americans in the Metropolitan Division. Schwarz was indefatigable, selling tickets, promoting the team and even selling concessions at halftimes. Over the years, Schwarz was one of the more important executives in the American Soccer League, In 1947, he became the league's vice president and in 1957, he served as the ASL Business Manager. In 1960, he became the vice president and general manager of the International Soccer League.

== Promoter ==
Schwarz also worked during World War II to convince American GIs living in Britain to play soccer, in hopes of growing the sport in America. He later organized tours by top European clubs in order to increase the popularity of the sport. He was also not set on the outdoor game, but in 1960, he also organized one of the first major indoor soccer tournaments at Madison Square Garden.

Schwarz was inducted into the National Soccer Hall of Fame in 1951. He died on 19 June 1977 in Queens.
