= Rudolph Nickolsburger =

Hungarian footballer

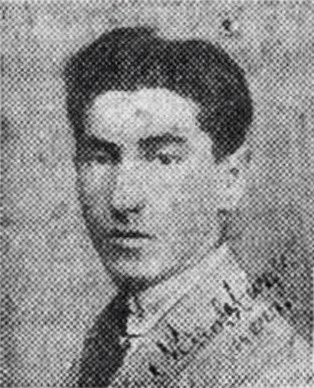

Personal information
- Date of birth: 21 March 1899
- Place of birth: Hungary
- Date of death: December 1969
- Place of death: New York, NY, United States
- Positions: Winger; centre-forward

Senior career*
Years	Team	Apps	(Gls)
19xx–1922	Ferencvárosi TC		
1922-xxxx	Makkabi Brno		
1925–1926	Played in Italy		
1926–1927	SC Hakoah Wien		
1928–1929	New York Hakoah		
1929–1932	Hakoah All-Stars	84	(30)

International career
1920–1925	Hungary	2	(0)
- * Club domestic league appearances and goals

Rudolph Nickolsburger (born 21 March 1899, Hungary; died New York, December 1969), also referred to as Nikolsburger Rezső and Rudy Nichols, was a Hungarian footballer who played for Ferencvárosi TC, SC Hakoah Wien and Hungary. He later emigrated to the United States where he played for New York Hakoah and Hakoah All-Stars.

== Club career ==
Nickolsburger played for Ferencvárosi TC during the early 1920s before leaving Budapest in 1922 to join Makkabi Brno in Czechoslovakia. This club consisted almost exclusively of Hungarian Jews. In the mid-1920s, Nickolsburger played in Italy. A Béla Nikolsbuger played as a centre forward for Forli during the 1925–26 season. This may be the same player.

In March 1927 Nickolsburger moved to Austria and joined the all-Jewish club SC Hakoah Wien. Then in April and May 1927 he joined the club on their second tour of the United States. He played in several games on the tour, scoring twice against the New York Giants. He then returned to Austria and started the 1927–28 season with SC Hakoah Wien. However, by 1928 he was back in the United States playing for New York Hakoah of the Eastern Soccer League, a team made-up of former SC Hakoah Wien players, including Béla Guttmann. In subsequently helped them win the 1929 National Challenge Cup. After a merger with Brooklyn Hakoah, they became the Hakoah All-Stars and entered the American Soccer League in the fall of 1929. Between 1929 and 1931 Nickolsburger played 84 league games and scored 30 goals for the All-Stars in the American Soccer League. His last confirmed game was on 12 June 1932 against the Bohemian Americans.

== Hungarian international ==
While with Ferencvárosi TC, Nickolsburger also played twice for Hungary. He made his international debut in 1920 against Austria. On 17 May 1925 he also played for a Hungary XI in a 4–1 win against a visiting Bolton Wanderers.

== Later years ==
Nickolsburger spent his later years in and around The Bronx, New York. His wife, Mary Tóth Nichols died in 1992. A son Leslie (Laszlo), who was born in Budapest in 1927, died in February 2006. His surviving daughter, Norma Lee Nichols Mahdavi, resides in New York. Nickolsburger's grandchildren, great-grandchildren and great-great grandchildren have settled in Florida, California, Brooklyn, Spain and Norway.

== Honours ==
New York Hakoah

- National Challenge Cup
  - 1929: 1
