= Moritz Häusler =

Austrian footballer

Personal information
- Date of birth: July 20, 1901
- Place of birth: Solotvyn, Austria-Hungary
- Date of death: December 24, 1952 (aged 51)
- Place of death: Vienna, Austria
- Position: Inside forward

Senior career*
Years	Team	Apps	(Gls)
1918–1926	Hakoah Vienna	43	(13)
1926–1928	New York Giants	84	(28)
1928–1929	New York Hakoah	?	(21)
1929–1931	Hakoah All-Stars	94	(29)
1931–1933	New York Americans		
1933–1934, 1936	Hakoah Vienna		

International career
1923–1925	Austria	7	(2)

Managerial career
- 1935: Garbarnia Kraków
- * Club domestic league appearances and goals

Moses “Moritz” or “Moschkatz” Häusler (July 20, 1901 in Solotvyn – December 24, 1952 in Vienna) was an early twentieth century Austrian football inside forward who played professionally in Austria and the United States. He also earned seven caps with the Austria national football team between 1923 and 1925.

== Player ==
=== Professional ===
Häusler began his career with Vienna based youth teams Armania and Romania. In 1918, he signed with Hakoah Vienna in Austria, but did not break into the first team until the 1919–1920 season. However, he remained a minor role player until the 1922–1923 season. In 1926, Hakoah Vienna toured the United States. Impressed by the high pay and low level of anti-Semitism compared to Europe, Häusler and several of his teammates decided to return to the United States to play in the American Soccer League. In the fall of 1926, Häusler signed with the New York Giants. In 1928, the ASL and the United States Soccer Federation began a struggle for supremacy in U.S. soccer. Known as the “Soccer War”, it led to the USFA declaring the ASL an “outlaw league” in the fall of 1928. At that time, Häusler had already played six games with the Giants. Declining to play with an “outlaw team” Häusler jumped to the competing, and legal, Eastern Professional Soccer League where he signed with New York Hakoah. New York Hakoah took second place in the ESL and won the 1929 National Challenge Cup with Häusler scoring a goal in Hakoah’s 3-0 victory over St. Louis Madison Kennel. At the end of 1929, the ASL made peace with USFA which brought about the merger of the ASL and ESL and the merger of the ESL New York Hakoah with the ASL Brooklyn Hakoah to form the Hakoah All-Stars. Häusler joined the new team and remained with it until 1931. That year, he signed with the New York Americans as the ASL began to collapse. In 1933, the Americans lost in the 1933 National Challenge Cup championship series. Following that loss, Häusler returned to Austria, where he rejoined Hakoah Vienna for the 1933–1934 season. He retired and became a coach, but returned to Hakoah Vienna at the end of the 1935–1936 season.

=== National team ===
Häusler earned seven caps, scoring two goals, with the Austria national team. His first came in an August 1923 victory over Finland. He scored in his second game with the national team, a win over Romania. His last game was a November 1925 game with Switzerland.

== Coach ==
Following his retirement in 1934, Häusler moved to Poland to coach Garbarnia Kraków. He later coached in northern Europe and Luxembourg.

In 1950, he returned to Vienna, where he owned a coffee house until his death in 1952.
