= Max Grünwald =

Austrian footballer

Personal information
- Place of birth: Austria
- Position: Inside forward

Senior career*
Years	Team	Apps	(Gls)
1920–1926	Hakoah Vienna	96	(35)
1926–1928	New York Giants	95	(50)
1928–1929	New York Hakoah	?	(19)
1929–1931	→ Hakoah All-Stars	66	(22)
1931–1932	Hakoah Vienna	10	(0)

International career
1924	Austria	1	(2)
- * Club domestic league appearances and goals

Max Grünwald (born in Austria) was an early twentieth century Austrian football (soccer) inside forward who played professionally in Austria and the United States.

== Club career ==
Grünwald joined Hakoah Vienna in 1920. In 1926, Hakoah toured the United States. Grünwald and several of his team mates decided to remain in the country to join local clubs. Grünwald signed with the New York Giants of the American Soccer League. He played with the Giants for three seasons, taking second in the league’s scoring table behind Andy Stevens in 1929. With the onset of the “Soccer Wars” between the ASL and the United States Soccer Federation, Grünwald jumped to the Eastern Professional Soccer League, the ASL having been declared an “outlaw league” by the USFA and FIFA. When he made the move, he signed with New York Hakoah which won the 1929 National Challenge Cup. Grünwald scored in the second game as Hakoah easily disposed of St. Louis Madison Kennel. The end of the “Soccer Wars” brought the merger of the ASL and ESL. When that occurred, New York Hakoah merged with Brooklyn Hakoah of the ASL to form the Hakoah All-Stars. Grünwald then played two seasons with the All-Stars. By 1931, the ASL was collapsing from the twin impacts of the “Soccer Wars” and the onset of the Great Depression. Consequently, Grünwald returned to Austria where he played at least one more season with Hakoah Vienna.

== International career ==
His only international appearance came on 21 May 1924, when he scored twice against Bulgaria.

=== International goals ===
#	Date	Venue	Opponent	Score	Result	Competition
1	21 May 1924	Simmering, Austria	Bulgaria	2–0	6–0	Friendly
2	21 May 1924	Simmering, Austria	Bulgaria	5–0	6–0	Friendly
