= Sándor Nemes =

Hungarian footballer

Sándor Nemes Alexander Neufeld Aleksandar Nemeš
Personal information
- Full name: Nemes Sándor
- Date of birth: 25 September 1899
- Place of birth: Budapest, Austro-Hungary
- Date of death: 27 October 1977 (aged 78)
- Place of death: Vienna, Austria
- Positions: Forward; right winger

Youth career
- ILK Budapest

Senior career*
Years	Team	Apps	(Gls)
1916–1919	Ferencváros	52	(19)
1919–1920	Hakoah Vienna		
1920	FC Basel	0	(0)
1920–1921	Maccabi Brno		
1921–1926	Hakoah Vienna		
1926–1927	Brooklyn Wanderers	20	(8)
1927–1929	Hakoah Vienna		
1929–1930	Hakoah All-Stars	22	(2)
1930	Fall River	1	(1)

International career
1918–1919	Hungary	3	(0)
1925	Austria	2	(0)

Managerial career
- 1931–1932: Hasmonea
- 1933–1935: BSK
- 1935–1936: Hapoel Hatzair
- 1936–1938: BSK
- 1938–1939: Bata Borovo
- 1939–1940: Fenerbahçe
- 1940–1941: Bata Borovo
- * Club domestic league appearances and goals

Sándor Nemes (25 September 1899 – 27 October 1977), also known as Alexander Neufeld and Aleksandar Nemeš, was a Hungarian football player and manager. He had a playing career in Hungary, Austria, Switzerland, United States and Yugoslavia, and he represented the national teams of Hungary and Austria.

== Playing career ==
Born in Budapest to a Jewish family, Sándor Nemes begin playing for a local club named ILK. When the club was disbanded in 1916 he joined Ferencvárosi TC where after playing initially in the youth team in same year due to his skills he got promoted to the senior squad. At first he played as striker but shortly after he changed his playing position to right-winger. He soon became an established player within the team, forming the attacking line along with Mihály Pataki and Isidor Gansl. In both 1918 and 1919 they finished second in the Hungarian Championship behind the then dominating MTK Budapest. With Ferencváros he played a total of 57 league matches having scored 18 goals

On 12 May 1918 he made his debut for the Hungarian national team playing in attack along Alfred Schaffer and Imre Schlosser in the 2–1 win over Switzerland in Budapest. A few weeks later, on 2 June, in Vienna, he played again this time winning Austria by 2–0.

On 5 October 1919, he played his third match for the Hungarian national team, again in Vienna against Austria, however this time they were defeated by 0–2. In that period because of the political situation, many Hungarian players were emigrating abroad, and Nemes was no exception and he signed with second league Austrian club SC Hakoah Vienna. As a way to overcame a bureaucratic problem over the signing, he accepted a job in a bank in Vienna.

He played his first match with Hakoah in November 1919 and became soon one of the most important players in their aspiration to get promotion to the first league. By then, the Hungarian Football Federation was having a violent confrontation with Austrian clubs over the players that begin playing for Austrian clubs without being officially released from their origin clubs in Hungary. Until the end of 1919 these players, among them Ferenc Plattkó, Jenö brothers, Kálmán Konrád, and Sándor Nemes included, were not allowed to play under the insistency of the Hungarian Federation to sanction them. This situation lasted until March 1920 when the players could finally return to play. In his first season with Hakoah, Nemes reached the semi-finals of the Austrian Cup.

Middle of that year 1920, Nemes rejoined his former club Ferencváros as they played a tournée in Switzerland. However instead of returning to Hungary he decided to stay in Switzerland and signed with FC Basel where his former national team colleague Alfred Schaffer played. Nemes played only one month with the team in two test games. He then received an invitation from the German businessman Otto Eidinger to participate in a newly formed Hungarian professional team that had programmed during the next year exhibition matches all over Europe. Sándor Nemes accepted the invitation, along with a number of other notable players like Plattkó, Pataki, József Ging, Gyula Feldmann and József Viola. However, after only a few weeks the tournée was abandoned with players complaining about not being paid. Most of the players returned to Austria and Hungary where they were sanctioned by the respective federations with Nemes receiving a suspension to last until April 1921. He didn't respect the suspension, and as most other players did, he moved to Czechoslovakia and signed with Maccabi Brno. However soon afterwards an agreement was reached about an amnesty for players that would accept to return, and thus Nemes returned to Hakoah in summer 1921 and became part of Hakoah team that this time played in the Austrian Bundesliga.

In his first complete season in 1921–22 Hakoah finished second in the league, only 2 points behind the leader. In the next season Hakoah finished in mid table, but Nemes impressed by scoring 16 goals and finishing in third place as league top scorer. In 1924, professionalization begin in Austrian football and in that same year Hakoah won the Austrian championship. They also won in the same year their first European title by beating West Ham United by 5–0 with Nemes scoring three goals in that final match.

By then, Nemes had already played four times with the city selection of Vienna, and Austria national team manager Hugo Meisl convoked him for the match on 5 July 1925, in Stockholm against Sweden, where he made his debut for the Austria national football team in the 4–2 win. He will play his second match for Austria on 8 November, that same year, in a 0–2 loss against Switzerland in Bern. He played both matches under the name of Alexander Neufeld.

In spring 1926 Hakoah made a successful tournée in the United States with a number of players receiving contract offers on behalf of American soccer clubs. Nemes returned to Austria and finished that season, however he had informed that at the end of the season he will leave Hakoah and move to the United States by accepting the offer of Brooklyn Wanderers to play in the American Soccer League. Along with Nemes, three other Hakoah players also moved to Brooklyn, namely Hoffer, Leopold Drucker and Heinrich Schoenfeld. After one season in America, Nemes returned to Hakoah, however he couldn't stop the fall of the club that lost its best players, and they ended up relegated that season. Nemes returned to the States in 1929 and played with Hakoah All-Stars until 1930. In fall of 1930 he played with Fall River F.C. helping them to win the 1930 American Soccer League.

== Coaching career ==
Seems that he returned to Austria in 1931 and worked one season as coach with a Second league Jewish club named Hasmonea, however the club ended up relegated due to the reduction in number of clubs for the next season and Nemes moved to Yugoslavia.

After coming to BSK in 1933, he won the Championship in 1933 and 1935 before having a year coaching experience with Hapoel Hatzair in Palestina, with Austrian Josef Uridil replacing him for that year at BSK. In 1936 however he returned to Belgrade. In June 1938 he graduated in a six-months coaching course organised by the Yugoslav Football Association. He took charge of Bata Borovo coming from SK Jugoslavia, in July 1938, replacing Bilek. Afterwards, he had a brief spell coaching Turkish Fenerbahçe before returning to Borovo.

== Name ==
His real name is Sándor Nemes, although for unknown reasons he begin to be known by the mid-1920s as Alexander Neufeld. Also, a number of Serbian sources name him in a third variant, as Aleksandar Nemeš. A match report from IFFHS refers to him as Alex Nemesch.

It also seems that some sources confused him with another Hungarian born footballer, Ferry Neufeld, who was initially named Ferenc Nemes, thus appearing Alexander Nemes as having played 2 matches and scoring one goal for the Palestine national team, when in fact it was Ferry Neufeld who played for Palestine in those matches.

He is also sometimes confused with another Hungarian coach, Károly Nemes, also known as Karlo or Dragutin Nemeš.

A coach known as G. Nemetz has coached Fenerbahçe between 1939 and 1940 although there is still no confirmation if it was Sandor Nemes.

== Honours ==
=== Player ===
Hakoah Vienna

- Austrian Championship: 1924–25

Fall River

- American Soccer League: 1930

=== Coach ===
BSK

- Yugoslav Championship: 1933, 1936
