= József Braun =

Hungarian footballer and manager

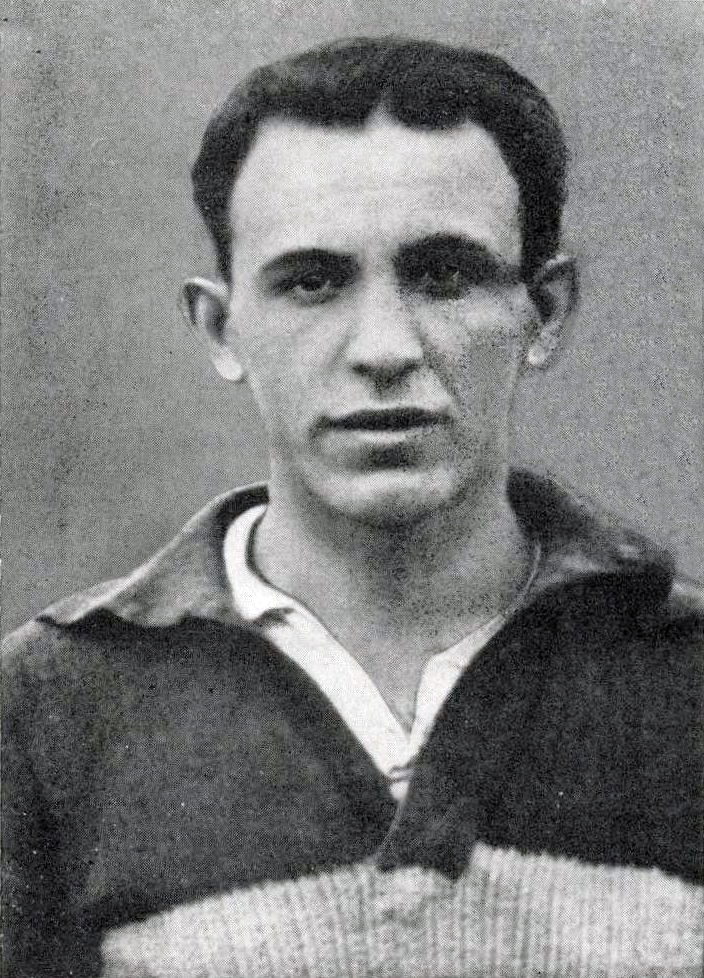
- Braun in 1926

Personal information
- Date of birth: 26 February 1901
- Place of birth: Budapest, Austria-Hungary
- Date of death: 20 February 1943 (aged 41)
- Place of death: Kharkiv, Soviet Union
- Position: Right winger

Youth career
- –1916: VAC Budapest

Senior career*
Years	Team	Apps	(Gls)
1916–1925	MTK Budapest		
1929	Brooklyn Hakoah	17	(1)
1929–1930	Brooklyn Wanderers	11	(2)

International career
1918–1926	Hungary	27	(11)

Managerial career
- 1932: Norway
- 1934–1937: ŠK Slovan Bratislava
- 1937–1939: MTK
- 1938: ŠK Slovan Bratislava
- * Club domestic league appearances and goals

József Braun (also known as József Barna; 26 February 1901 – 20 February 1943) was a Hungarian Olympic footballer who played as an outside forward. Braun began his career in Hungary before finishing it in the American Soccer League. He earned 27 caps, scoring 11 goals, with the Hungary national team. After retiring from playing, he coached for several years. Braun was killed in 1943 in a Nazi forced labor camp.

== Early and personal life ==
He was Jewish. His nephew is András Kepes journalist, documentary filmmaker and author.

== Club career ==
Braun played as youth with VAC Budapest. In 1916, he signed for MTK Budapest in the Hungarian League, where he played primarily as a right wing back. In 1919, he was selected as the Hungarian Player of the Year. During his years with MTK Budapest, Braun won nine Hungarian championships and two Hungarian cups. He retired from playing in 1925 after suffering from multiple injuries.

In 1929, he moved to the United States, where he attempted a comeback with the Brooklyn Hakoah of the American Soccer League. He played 17 games before moving to the Brooklyn Wanderers in the fall of 1929. He played 11 games during the 1929–30 season, then retired permanently.

== National team ==
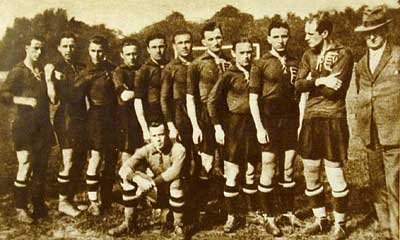
1924 Magyar team; Károly Fogl, Zoltán Opata, Ferenc Hirzer, Rudolf Jeny, József Eisenhoffer, Béla Guttmann, Gyula Mándi, Gábor Obitz, József Braun, György Orth, János Biri, and Gyula Kiss

After making his international debut at 17 years of age, Braun earned 27 caps, scoring 11 goals, with the Hungary national team. His first came in a 6 October 1918 victory over Austria. His last came in a 3–3 tie with Portugal in December 1926.

He was a member of the Hungarian soccer team at the 1924 Summer Olympics, where he played two matches.

== Coach ==
After the break of his active football career, he continued his work in sports as a coach. During 1932, he was a member of a four-member commission in the role of coach of the Norwegian national team for four games. Braun later coached ŠK Slovan Bratislava from 1935 to 1938.

== Death in Nazi camp ==
Drafted as a Jew into forced labour in support of the Hungarian Army in the Eastern Front in World War II, Braun was killed in 1943 in a Nazi forced labor camp in Ukraine.
