= Károly Fogl =

Hungarian footballer

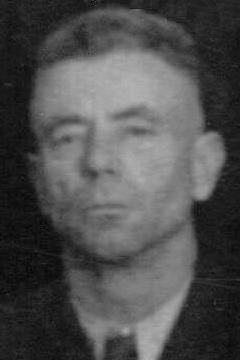

Personal information
- Date of birth: 19 January 1895
- Place of birth: Újpest, Austria-Hungary
- Date of death: 12 January 1969 (aged 73)
- Place of death: Budapest, Hungary
- Position: Defender

Senior career*
Years	Team	Apps	(Gls)
1912–1914	Újpesti Törekvés SE		
1914–1930	Újpest		
1931	Vasas SC		

International career
1918–1929	Hungary	51	(2)

Managerial career
- 1934–1935: Bulgaria
- 1935: Sportklub Sofia
- 1937: Győri Vagongyár ETO
- 1938–1939: Warta Poznań
- Kolozsvári AC
- 1947–1948: Warta Poznań
- 1948: Polonia Warsaw
- 1950–1951: Warta Poznań
- 1952: Brda Bydgoszcz
- 1953: Czarni Nakło
- 1955–1956: Polonia Chodzież
- 1957–1958: Olimpia Poznań
- * Club domestic league appearances and goals

Károly Fogl, also known as Károly Fogoly, "Károly Újpesti" and "Fogl II" (19 January 1895 – 12 January 1969) was a Hungarian footballer and manager. He represented the Hungary national team at the 1924 Summer Olympics.

Fogl was born in Újpest (today part of Budapest), Hungary. Between 1918 and 1929 he played 50 games and scored 2 goals for the Hungary national team as a right defender. Together with his younger brother, József Fogl III, the two Fogls formed the legendary "Fogl-gate" (Fogl-gát in Hungarian), an extremely powerful and tough defending formation for more than a decade. Fogl II won the 1929–30 season with Újpest and served as a captain of the club for a decade.

After his player career, he went on to coach Sportklub Sofia and the Bulgaria national team. Later he managed Juventus Bucuresti and in 1937 he led Győri ETO to the Hungarian top division NB I for the first time in the club's history. He was manager of the Polish football club Warta Poznań on three occasions: 1938-1939, 1947-1948 and 1950-1951, leading the club to their second national championship title in 1947.

He died on 12 January 1969 in Budapest.

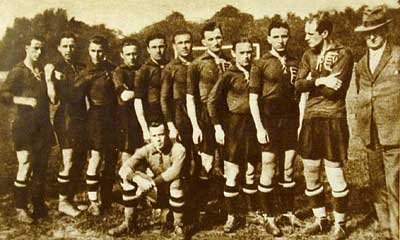
1924 Maygar team; Károly Fogl, Zoltán Opata, Ferenc Hirzer, Rudolf Jeny, József Eisenhoffer, Béla Guttmann, Gyula Mándi, Gábor Obitz, József Braun, György Orth, János Biri, and Gyula Kiss

== Honours ==
Warta Poznań

- Ekstraklasa: 1947
