= Josef Grünfeld =

German footballer

Personal information
- Place of birth: Germany
- Position: Centre forward

Senior career*
Years	Team	Apps	(Gls)
- Hakoah Wien
1928–1929	Stuttgarter Kickers		
1929	Hakoah Wien		
1929	New York Hakoah	2	(0)
1929–1930	Hakoah All-Stars	63	(23)
- * Club domestic league appearances and goals

Joszef “Josef” Grünfeld was a German association footballer who played as a centre forward in Germany, Austria and the United States.

In 1920–21, Grünfeld, brother of Bernhard Grünfeld, played for Hakoah Wien. During the 1928-29 season, he played for Stuttgarter Kickers in the Bezirksliga Württemberg-Baden. In 1929, he briefly played for Hakoah Wien in the Austrian Nationalliga before moving to the United States where he joined New York Hakoah in the Eastern Professional Soccer League for two games. The EPSL ceased operation just after Grünfeld arrived and merged with the American Soccer League. When that happened, New York Hakoah merged with Brooklyn Hakoah of the ASL to form the Hakoah All-Stars.
