= Gábor Obitz =

Hungarian footballer and manager (1899–1953)

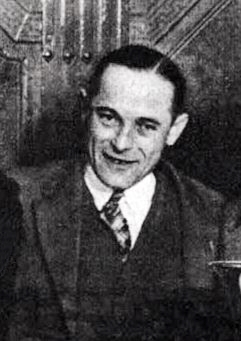
- Obitz in 1930

Personal information
- Date of birth: 18 January 1899
- Place of birth: Budapest, Hungary
- Date of death: 20 March 1953 (aged 54)
- Place of death: Hungary
- Position: Centre half

Senior career*
| Years | Team | Apps | (Gls) |
| 1920–1922 | Ferencváros | | |
| 1922–1924 | Maccabi Brno | | |
| 1924–1926 | Holstein Kiel | | |
| 1926–1931 | Ferencváros | 115 | (2) |

International career
| 1921–1930 | Hungary | 15 | (0) |

Managerial career
- 1931–1932: AMEF Arad
- 1936–1937: SK Ljubljana
- 1939: Finland
- 1945–: Zuglói AC
- * Club domestic league appearances and goals

Gábor Obitz also known as Gábor Óbecsei and Gábor Ormai (18 January 1899 – 20 March 1953) was a Hungarian football player and manager.

== Playing career ==
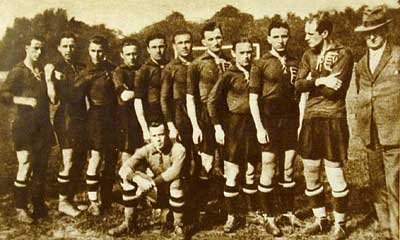
1924 Maygar team; Károly Fogl, Zoltán Opata, Ferenc Hirzer, Rudolf Jeny, József Eisenhoffer, Béla Guttmann, Gyula Mándi, Gábor Obitz, József Braun, György Orth, János Biri, and Gyula Kiss

Obitz started his career in Ferencváros. After winning the Hungarian Cup title in 1922 he moved to Czechoslovakia and played two seasons for Makkabi Brno. In 1924 he joined German club Holstein Kiel. He ended his career with Ferencváros.

Obitz capped 15 times for the Hungary national team and participated the 1924 Summer Olympics in Paris.

== Coaching career ==
Obitz' first team as a manager was a Romanian club AMEF Arad. From 1932 to 1934 he worked for the Turkish Football Federation. He coached NK Ljubljana in the 1936–37 Yugoslav Football Championship. In 1939 Obitz started coaching the Finland national team but soon returned to Hungary due to World War II.

== Honours ==
- Hungarian Championship: 1927, 1928
- Hungarian Cup: 1921, 1927, 1928
- Mitropa Cup: 1928
