= Zoltán Opata =

Hungarian footballer and manager

Personal information
- Date of birth: 24 September 1900
- Place of birth: Budapest, Austria-Hungary
- Date of death: 19 May 1982 (aged 81)
- Place of death: Budapest, Hungary
- Positions: Forward; winger

Senior career*
Years	Team	Apps	(Gls)
1917–1920	Budapesti MÁVAG		
1920–1924	MTK Budapest		
1924	Maccabi Brno		
1924–1929	MTK Budapest		
1929–1930	Attila FC		
1930–1931	Nemzeti SC		
1931–1932	Bocskai FC		
1932–1933	OSC Lille (?)		
1933	MTK		
1934–1935	Attila FC		
1935–1936	AC Nitra		

International career
1922–1930	Hungary	17	(6)

Managerial career
- 1936: Hungary
- 1937–1938: HAŠK
- 1941–1945: Kolozsvári AC
- 1946–1947: ITA Arad
- 1947: Ferencváros
- 1950–1951: Újpest FC
- 1951: Csepel SC
- 1957–1958: Górnik Zabrze
- * Club domestic league appearances and goals

Zoltán Opata (also known as Zoltán Patai or Ormos Patai; 24 September 1900 – 19 May 1982) was a Hungarian football player and manager. As a player, he won six Hungarian league championships with Budapest-based side MTK in the 1920s and regularly appeared for Hungary national football team. After retiring from playing he became a manager and had successful spells with clubs in Yugoslavia, Romania and Poland.

== Playing career ==
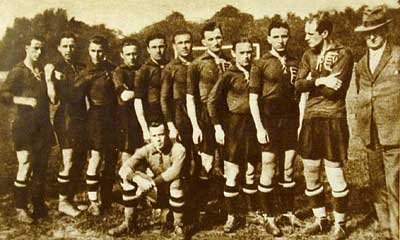
1924 Hungarian team; Károly Fogl, Zoltán Opata, Ferenc Hirzer, Rudolf Jeny, József Eisenhoffer, Béla Guttmann, Gyula Mándi, Gábor Obitz, József Braun, György Orth, János Biri, and Gyula Kiss

Born in Budapest, Opata first began playing as a teenager at local minnows MÁVAG in 1917. Three years later he accepted an offer to join Hungarian club MTK, who had lost some of their strikers to foreign clubs in the previous two years. Opata immediately established himself as a regular member of a star-studded squad along with teammates György Orth, József Braun and Imre Schlosser. In the next five years between 1920 and 1925 MTK absolutely dominated the game and topped the Hungarian League every season, in addition to winning two Hungarian Cups.

Opata went on to spend the best part of the decade with MTK (bar a brief spell with the Slovak side Maccabi Brno in 1924), although in the latter part of the 1920s their fortunes began to change – their cross-city rivals Ferencváros TC won three consecutive titles between 1926 and 1928; MTK won only one other league title with Opata in 1929. That year he left MTK and had short spells with several smaller Hungarian sides, including the Miskolc-based Attila FC, Nemzeti SC and Bocskai SC in Debrecen and, according to some sources, he even spent the 1932–33 season at OSC Lille in France. He then returned to MTK briefly in 1933, and then signed for Attila FC again as player-manager in early 1934. Later that year he had in the same role at AC Nitra in Slovakia.

His first appearance for Hungary national team came in April 1922 when he played as a right winger in a friendly against Austria which ended in a 1–1 draw, and his first goal came in 7–1 win against Italy in April 1924. That same year Opata was selected for the Hungary squad which competed in the 1924 Summer Olympics in Paris, where they were considered one of the favorites of the tournament. In the first round they trashed Poland 5–0 with Opata scoring a brace. However, in their second round match Hungary suffered a sensational 0–3 defeat to underdogs Egypt which ended their hopes of winning Olympic medals.

Opata continued to be a regular member of the national team until for the next three years and was used by managers in all positions in the attacking line, appearing in a total of 17 matches and scoring 6 goals between 1922 and 1927. After that period he was called up only once, three years later in the last game of the 1927–30 Central European International Cup against Italy in Budapest which they went on to lose 0–5.

== Coaching career ==
As Opata had already started working as a player-manager in the mid-1930s he immediately took up coaching after his playing career had ended around 1935. He first managed Hungary at the 1936 Summer Olympics in Berlin where they got knocked out in the first round by Poland.

Opata would go abroad and coach the Croatian side HAŠK, from 1937 to 1938, to their first and only national title, Yugoslav First League in 1938. Between 1941 and 1945 he coached CFR Cluj in Romania and in 1947 he signed for ITA Arad and they won the 1946–47 Romanian championship. He then briefly returned to Hungary and had spells with Ferencváros TC, Újpest FC and Csepel SC. In the so-called "Mighty Magyars" era of the early 1950s Opata was a member of the national team's coaching staff and in that capacity helped them win gold in the 1952 Summer Olympics. He then coached the Polish club Górnik Zabrze and they won the 1957 Polish league with them before retiring in 1958.

== Honours ==
=== As player ===
MTK Budapest

- Nemzeti Bajnokság I: 1920–21, 1921–22, 1922–23, 1923–24, 1924–25, 1928–29
- Magyar Kupa: 1922–23, 1924–25

=== As manager ===
HAŠK

- Yugoslav League: 1937–38

UTA Arad

- Liga I: 1946–47

Górnik Zabrze

- Ekstraklasa: 1957
