= Ferenc Hirzer =

Hungarian footballer and manager

Personal information
- Date of birth: 21 November 1902
- Place of birth: Budapest, Hungary
- Date of death: 28 April 1957 (aged 54)
- Place of death: Trento, Italy
- Height: 1.72 m (5 ft 8 in)
- Position: Striker

Senior career*
Years	Team	Apps	(Gls)
1913–1923	Törekvés SE	53	(19)
1923–1924	Makkabi Brno		
1924–1925	Union 03 Altona		
1925–1927	Juventus	43	(50)
1927–1932	MTK Hungária	107	(68)
1934–1935	III. Kerületi TVE	9	(1)

International career
1922–1932	Hungary	33	(14)

Managerial career
- 1935–1936: Mantova Sportiva
- 1936–1938: Salernitana
- 1938–1939: Anconitana
- 1939-1940: Liguria
- 1940–1941: Salernitana
- 1942–1943: Perugia
- 1946–1947: Sestrese
- 1954–1955: Aosta
- * Club domestic league appearances and goals

Ferenc Hirzer (21 November 1902 – 28 April 1957) known in Hungarian as Ferenc Híres was a Hungarian football player and manager, who played as a forward during the 1910s and 1920s; he is perhaps best known for his time with Italian side Juventus. He also played for the Hungary national football team thirty-three different times, scoring fourteen goals.

== Club career ==
Hirzer began his football career in 1913 with local Budapest side Törekvés SE, which was put together by railroadmen. In the early 1920s, the club reached the upper parts of the Hungarian League but it was largely dominated at the time by MTK Budapest.

After around a decade playing for his hometown club, Ferenc Hirzer moved to Czechoslovakia to play for Makkabi Brno. The following season, he moved to Germany to play for Union 03 Altona in the city of Hamburg, they finished runners-up in the Norddeutsche Liga.

For the 1925–26 season, Hirzer moved country again; this time to Italy with Turin giants Juventus. A fellow Hungarian, Jenő Károly was manager at the time and he had already brought former Törekvés player József Viola to the club. He made his debut in October 1925 against Parma scoring a hat-trick.

Juventus were crowned champions of the Italian Football Championship for the first time in 20 years; Hirzer himself had a very impressive end of season record, scoring 35 goals in astonishingly 24 games. This record for the most goals scored by a Juventus player in a single season in the best Italian league, then named Prima Divisione, has never been broken. After one more season at Juventus, where they finished 3rd behind Torino and Bologna he left Italian football. Hirzer had scored a total of 50 goals in 43 games for Juventus during his time with them.

He returned to Hungary in 1927 and played for MTK Hungária back in Budapest. During the 1928–29 season, Hirzer's final season as a player, the club won the Hungarian League title. After his playing career, Hirzer returned to Italy and managed several Italian clubs until around the time of his death, the club he managed for the longest period was Salernitana in Campania.

== International career ==
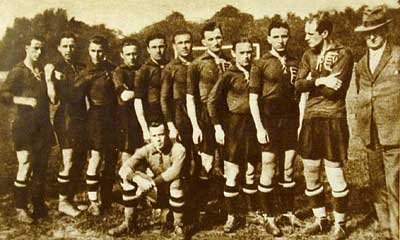
1924 Magyar team: Károly Fogl, Zoltán Opata, Ferenc Hirzer, Rudolf Jeny, József Eisenhoffer, Béla Guttmann, Gyula Mándi, Gábor Obitz, József Braun, György Orth, János Biri and Gyula Kiss

Hirzer was first called up for duty in the Hungary national side for a match against Switzerland in June 1922, the game ended in a 1–1 draw. He represented Hungary at the 1924 Summer Olympics in Paris, where he scored two goals in the first round 5–0 victory against Poland, in the next round however they were knocked out with a shock 3-0 defeat to Egypt.

He also represented Hungary in the 1927-30 Central European International Cup, where he became top scorer but despite his efforts, Hungary ended as fourth. In total he scored 14 goals in 32 games for his country.

== Honours ==
=== Club ===
Juventus

- Serie A/Prima Divisione: 1925–26

MTK Hungária

- Hungarian League: 1928–29

=== International ===
Hungary

- Central European International Cup: Fourth 1927-30

=== Individual ===
- Central European International Cup: Top scorer 1927-30
- Serie A Top-scorer: 1925–26 (35 goals in Prima Divisione in 24 games)
