= Heinrich Schönfeld =

Austrian footballer and manager

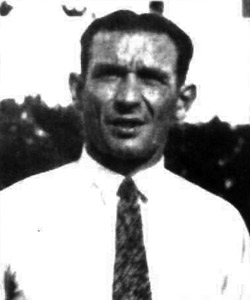
- Schönfeld in 1930

Personal information
- Date of birth: 3 August 1900
- Place of birth: Kolozsvár, Austria-Hungary
- Date of death: 3 September 1976 (aged 76)
- Place of death: Toronto, Ontario, Canada
- Position: Forward

Senior career*
Years	Team	Apps	(Gls)
1916–1921	SpC Rudolfshügel		
1921–1923	Merano		
1923–1925	Torino	30	(23)
1925–1926	Inter Milan	14	(7)
1926	Hakoah Vienna	8	(6)
1926–1927	Brooklyn Wanderers	6	(3)
1927–1928	Hakoah Vienna	10	(4)
1928–1929	Brooklyn Hakoah	12	(11)
1929–1930	Hakoah All-Stars	6	(0)

Managerial career
- 1930–1933: Juventus Trapani
- 1933: Catanzarese
- 1933–1935: Juventus Trapani
- * Club domestic league appearances and goals

Heinrich Schönfeld (3 August 1900 – 3 September 1976) was an Austrian footballer who played as a forward, and football manager.

== Club career ==
Nicknamed "Beppo", Schönfeld was born in Kolozsvár, Austria-Hungary, and was Jewish. He made his professional debut as a goalkeeper in 1916 at 16 years of age for Austrian team SpC Rudolfshügel, but was later converted into a striker. He moved to Sportclub Meran in 1921.

In 1923, Schönfeld moved to Italian side Torino. There, he became the top scorer in the 1923–1924 Serie A, scoring 22 goals, in 20 games, as he scored 51.1% of this team's goals. He spent one season with Inter Milan. He returned to Austria in 1926 with Hakoah Vienna. In 1926, he played a tour in the United States with Hakoah.

He later spent time playing in the American Soccer League with Brooklyn Wanderers, Brooklyn Hakoah, and New York Hakoah. He coached in Italy between 1930 and 1935 for Juventus Trapani and Catanzarese.

Schönfeld emigrated to Canada with his wife Elisabeth in 1952. He died in Toronto on 3 September 1976.
