= Gyula Mándi =

Hungarian footballer (1899–1969)

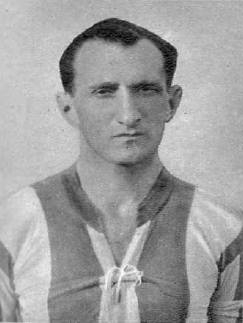

Personal information
- Date of birth: 14 July 1899
- Place of birth: Budapest, Austria-Hungary
- Date of death: 26 November 1969 (aged 70)
- Place of death: Budapest, Hungarian PR
- Position: Defender

Senior career*
Years	Team	Apps	(Gls)
1919–29	MTK	324	(12)
1929–37	Hungária FC		

International career
1921–1934	Hungary	32	(0)

Managerial career
- 1950–1956: Hungary
- 1957–1958: America FC (RJ)
- 1959–1963: Israel
- 1964: Israel
Medal record
Men's football
Representing Israel (as manager)
AFC Asian Cup
Runner-up	1960 South Korea
- * Club domestic league appearances and goals

Gyula Mándi, also referred to as Mándi Gyula or Julius Mandel (14 July 1899 – 26 November 1969) was a Hungarian Olympic national team (for whom he played 32 matches) and club footballer (with whom he won 10 league titles), who played as a defender and fullback/ He was also a manager of club and national teams. He was Jewish.

== Playing career ==
=== Club ===
Mándi was born in Budapest, Hungary. As a footballer, he was dubbed "the artist of positioning, and world champion of timing." Playing club football, he won 10 league titles.

He was part of the greatest era of MTK, the 1920s and 1930s. He was signed by MTK in 1919 at 20 years of age. He played alongside the likes of Franz Platko, Béla Guttmann, Gusztáv Sebes, Jenő Kálmár, Imre Schlosser, Iuliu Baratky and Ferenc Sas. Between 1919 and 1925 he won seven consecutive championships with MTK.

The professionalisation of the game in Hungary weakened MTK's absolute dominance, but they remained amongst the leading sides. Until the end of his career in 1937, he could celebrate three more championships. Between 1923 and 1933, he also won cups with the club; altogether, Mándi made 325 appearances for MTK.

=== International ===
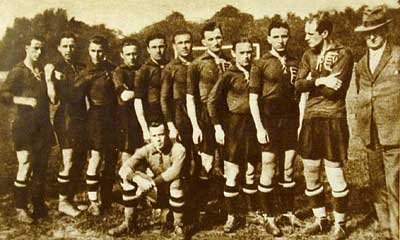
1924 Maygar team; Károly Fogl, Zoltán Opata, Ferenc Hirzer, Rudolf Jeny, József Eisenhoffer, Béla Guttmann, Gyula Mándi, Gábor Obitz, József Braun, György Orth, János Biri, and Gyula Kiss

Mándi's career with the Hungary national team commenced in June 1921 with a match against Germany. Soon he featured regularly in the side, forming the defense together with Károly Fogl. He won 32 international caps.

Hungary participated in the football tournament of the 1924 Olympic Games in Paris. Hungary's hopes rose after a decisive first round win over Poland. However, a sensational 0–3 defeat at the hands of Egypt in the second stage ended the aspirations of the Magyars. Mándi played in both matches.

A knee injury prevented Mándi from continuing his international career until 1929, when he again featured regularly until 1932, including five matches for the Central European International Cup. After missing out on further nominations for a two years, he returned once more to the Hungarian side for a World Cup qualifier against Bulgaria in 1934. Altogether he played 32 times for his country.

== Nazi occupation ==
Mandi survived the Holocaust during the Nazi occupation of Poland in World War II with the assistance of his Christian brother-in-law, György Szomolányi. Szomolányi was the managing director of a paper mill that had been converted to produce wooden stocks for rifles to support the Nazi war effort. He was able to employ whomever he wished.

In 1942 he saved Mándi from a Jewish labor detail by giving Mándi papers to work in his factory. Two years later, however, Mándi couldn’t avoid labor service. He was sent on a train bound for Ukraine, but wrote a postcard to Szomolányi and threw it from the train. Someone found it and mailed it, but when it arrived it had been torn, and all that could be read was the word ‘KELPUSZTA’. Szomolányi realised this must be Ekelpuszta, where a transit camp had been set up. He donned his World War I officer’s uniform, strode into the camp, and demanded that he be given five men for an essential task. Impressed, the guards told him to take his pick. Szomolányi selected Mándi and four others.

== Coaching career ==
After retiring as a player, Mándi became a coach and was the manager of the Hungary national football team during the era of the Mighty Magyars. His training regimen for the team was unusual for the time, as he encouraged the men to practice athletics and mountaineering, and to train with the ball and in match situations.

From 1956 to 1958 he coached Brazil.

In mid-August 1957 Mándi became coach of America FC in Rio de Janeiro. His spell there with a mid-table placing at the State Championship of Rio 1957 and a joint last place at the Rio-São Paulo Tournament of 1958 was considered unsatisfactory and ended at the end of April 1958.

Between 1959 and 1964, Mandi had two spells as coach of Israel, with whom he reached the final of the 1960 Asian Cup.

== Honours ==
=== Player ===
MTK Hungária FC

- Hungarian League (10): 1919, 1920, 1921, 1922, 1923, 1924, 1925, 1929, 1936, 1937
- Hungarian Cup: 1923, 1925, 1932; runner-up 1930, 1935

=== Manager ===
Israel

- AFC Asian Cup: Runner-up, 1960

== See also ==
- List of select Jewish football (association; soccer) players

== Sources ==
- Wilson, Jonathan (17 February 2006). Behind the Curtain: Travels in Football in Eastern Europe. Orion. ISBN 978-0752869070.
- The Nearly Men: Brian Glanville, World Soccer, November 2006
