= Bud Grennon =

American soccer player

Edward "Bud" Grennon was an American soccer forward who spent his entire career in the St. Louis, Missouri leagues. He finished toward the top of the league's scoring table every season from 1929 to 1932.

== Biography ==
During the 1928–1929 St. Louis Soccer League season, he scored eight goals for St. Louis Madison Kennel, putting him sixth on the goals list. On March 17, 1929, he scored three goals as Madison defeated Chicago Sparta 7–4 in the semifinal of the 1929 National Challenge Cup. In 1931, he played for Coca Colas, he again scored eight goals putting him fifth on the league's scoring list. The next year, he tied with Joe Hennessey at the top of the goals list with eleven. He was back with Coca Colas for the next season where he finished second in scoring with nine goals.

In 1973, he was inducted into the St. Louis Soccer Hall of Fame.
