= Isidor Gansl =

Romanian footballer

Personal information
- Date of birth: 16 November 1896
- Place of birth: Ásvány, Austria-Hungary
- Date of death: 15 October 1938 (aged 41)
- Place of death: Vienna, Germany
- Position: Forward

Senior career*
Years	Team	Apps	(Gls)
1914–1918	Wiener	7	(7)
1918–1919	Ferencvárosi TC	11	(5)
1919–1922	Hakoah Vienna (Note: The statistics for the 1919–20 2. Klasse season are unavailable.)	62	(28)
1923–1924	Maccabi Cernăuți		
1924–1926	Hakoah Graz		
Total		80	(40)

International career
1923	Romania	1	(2)

Managerial career
- 1929–1934: US Tunisienne
- * Club domestic league appearances and goals

Isidor Gansl (16 November 1896 – 15 October 1938) was a Romanian football forward of Jewish origin.

== Club career ==
Gansl was born on 16 November 1896 in Ásvány, Austria-Hungary. At age 16, he founded the football club Sportclub Unitas alongside his brother, Max. In 1914, he went to play for Wiener. Four years later, Gansl joined Ferencvárosi TC where he formed an offensive trio along with Sándor Nemes and Mihály Pataki. Gansl made his Nemzeti Bajnokság I debut on 8 December 1918 in a 2–0 home win over Terézvárosi TC in which he scored a goal. Ferencvárosi TC finished the season in second place and he contributed with four more goals, including a goal in a 2–0 victory against Kispest, a double in a 3–0 success over Budapesti AK and the only goal of a 1–0 win against Törekvés SE. Subsequently, Gansl joined Hakoah Vienna where he was teammates with his brother Jeno and former Ferencvárosi TC colleague Nemes. He helped them gain promotion to the first league at the end of the 1919–20 2. Klasse season. In the middle of the 1922–23 season, he went to play for one and a half seasons at Maccabi Cernăuți. Afterwards, Gansl joined Hakoah Graz where he ended his career in 1926. He had to retire at age 30 because of an injury, even though he had an offer to play for Hakoah Vienna.

== International career ==
Gansl played one match for Romania on 26 October 1923 under coach Constantin Rădulescu in a 2–2 friendly draw against Turkey in which he scored both of his side's goals. Thus he became the first player to score a double for Romania.

=== International goals ===
Scores and results list Romania's goal tally first, score column indicates score after each Gansl goal.

List of international goals scored by Isidor Gansl
#	Date	Venue	Cap	Opponent	Score	Result	Competition
1	26 October 1923	Taksim Stadium, Istanbul, Turkey	1	Turkey	1–0	2–2	Friendly
2	26 October 1923	Taksim Stadium, Istanbul, Turkey	1	Turkey	2–2	2–2	Friendly

== Managerial career ==
Gansl coached US Tunisienne from 1929 to 1934, a period in which the club won three Tunisian league titles.

== Death ==
By the end of his life, Gansl struggled with a disease that left him paralyzed. He died on 15 October 1938 in a hospital in Vienna at age 41.

== Honours ==
=== Player ===
Hakoah Vienna

- 2. Klasse: 1919–20

=== Manager ===
US Tunisienne

- Tunisian league: 1929–30, 1930–31, 1932–33
