= Max Scheuer =

Austrian footballer

Personal information
- Date of birth: 9 September 1895
- Place of birth: Austria-Hungary
- Date of death: post August 1941
- Place of death: Auschwitz, German-occupied Poland
- Position: Defender

International career
Years	Team	Apps	(Gls)
1923	Austria	1	(0)

Max Scheuer (9 September 1895 – post August 1941) was an Austrian international footballer who played the defender position. He played for the Austria national football team in the 1923 season. In the 1920s, he played for and captained Hakoah Vienna. He was murdered in the Auschwitz concentration camp at some point after August 1941.

== Biography ==
Scheuer was born in Austria, and was Jewish.

Scheuer was in the starting lineup and played as a defender for the Austria national football team against the Hungary national football team in a FIFA match in the 1923 season.

In the 1920s Scheuer played for and captained Hakoah Vienna, an all-Jewish club. With the team he won the Austrian championship in the 1924–25 Austrian First League season, the first professional Austrian football title.

In 1927, he and the team came to the United States to play the Bethlehem Steel Football Club in Bethlehem, Pennsylvania, the defending U.S. champion and 1926-27 champion of the American Soccer League. He fled Austria to France, and played briefly for Olympique Marseille.

He was captured by the Nazis while he was in France, on his way to neutral Switzerland. Aged 45, Scheuer was sent to Drancy internment camp in France, and then to Auschwitz concentration camp, where he was killed in the early 1940s.

Scheuer was one of at least seven Hakoah footballers killed in the Holocaust. Others were Josef Kolisch, Ali Schönfeld, Oskar Grasgrün, Ernst Horowitz, and the brothers Erwin Pollak and Oskar Pollak.
