= Ben Zinn =

Israeli-American soccer player and academic

Personal information
- Full name: Ben Tzion Cynowicz
- Date of birth: April 21, 1937 (age 89)
- Place of birth: Tel Aviv, Mandatory Palestine
- Position: Striker

Senior career*
Years	Team	Apps	(Gls)
1955–1957	Hapoel Tel Aviv		
1957–1961	NYU Violets		
1959	New York Hakoah		
1961–1962	Stanford Cardinal		
1962–1965	Princeton University		

International career
1959	United States	1	(0)
- * Club domestic league appearances and goals

Ben T. Zinn (Hebrew: בן צין; born April 21, 1937) is an American academic in engineering and former international soccer player. He is the David S. Lewis Jr., Chair and Regents' Professor at the Georgia Institute of Technology.

== Biography ==
Ben T. Zinn was born as Ben Tzion Cynowicz in Tel Aviv in 1937; his parents had moved there from Poland in 1936. Zinn's grandparents and twelve uncles and aunts all died in Nazi concentration camps.

=== Personal life ===
Zinn has two children from a previous marriage to the daughter of Erno Schwarcz - daughter Leslie Zinn and son Edward Zinn, both of whom attended Georgia Tech.

=== Name ===
Zinn's Polish surname was "Cynowicz", which in Hebrew was spelled as "Tzinovitz". To conform with Israeli government policy, it was shortened to "Tzinn", which was the name he used to travel with the Israeli All Star team. When he came to America he used both "Cinovitz" and "Cinowitz", with the latter being the name he used in his national team career. He later reverted to his official Hebrew surname of "Tzinn", which was then shortened to "Zinn".

== Career ==
=== Soccer career ===
Playing with league champions Hapoel Tel Aviv and an Israeli "All Star" side which toured Europe and the US, Zinn began his soccer career in Israel. Zinn played soccer for New York University where he averaged 3.2 goals per game, and where he eventually became club captain. He also played part-time for New York Hakoah in the American Soccer League. Zinn made one official appearance on May 28, 1959, for the United States men's national soccer team, in an 8–1 defeat to England. Zinn was also a member of the national team squad for unofficial games on a number of other occasions. When Zinn became a professor at Georgia Tech in 1965, he turned down an invitation to join the Israel national side, professional soccer contract in the NASL from the Atlanta Chiefs, and an invitation to try out as a field kicker for the Atlanta Falcons.

=== Academic career ===
After missing an entrance exam for Technion – Israel Institute of Technology, Zinn moved to New York City to attend the New York University. After spending four years at NYU, Zinn attended Stanford University and earned his M.S. degree. He then pursued graduate studies at Princeton University, where he received his Ph.D. in mechanical and aerospace engineering in 1966 after completing a doctoral dissertation titled "A theoretical study of nonlinear transverse combustion instability in liquid propellant rocket motors." He began his forty-year association with Georgia Tech in 1965. Zinn is a member of the National Academy of Engineering. Zinn was awarded the George Westinghouse Gold Medal by the American Society of Mechanical Engineers in 2006. Zinn also holds thirteen patents. Georgia Tech's combustion laboratory is named after Zinn.
