= György Orth =

Hungarian football player and manager (1901–1962)

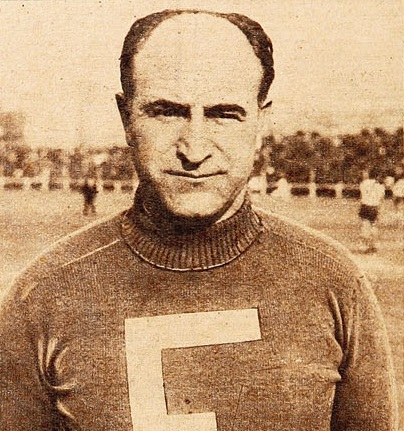
- Orth in 1944

Personal information
- Date of birth: 30 April 1901
- Place of birth: Budapest, Kingdom of Hungary
- Date of death: 11 January 1962 (aged 60)
- Place of death: Porto, Portugal
- Positions: Attacking midfielder; forward

Senior career*
Years	Team	Apps	(Gls)
1915	Vasas		
1916	Pisa		
1917–1927	MTK Budapest	127	(103)
1923	→ First Vienna (loan)		
1928–1929	Marseille		
1929–1930	Budai 11	3	(1)
1932	Budai 11	1	(0)
1933	Bocskai	1	(0)

International career
1917–1927	Hungary	32	(13)

Managerial career
- 1930: Chile
- 1930–1931: Colo Colo
- 1932: Bocskai FC
- 1933–1935: Messina
- Pisa Calcio
- 1935–1936: Genoa
- 1936–1939: 1. FC Nürnberg
- 1938–1939: Metz
- 1939–1940: Catania
- Savona
- 1944: San Lorenzo de Almagro
- 1945: Rosario Central
- 1946–1949: Deportivo Guadalajara
- 1947: Mexico
- 1950–1951: Club América
- 1955–1956: Cauca Valley
- 1957–1960: Peru
- 1960–1962: Porto
- * Club domestic league appearances and goals

György Orth (30 April 1901 – 11 January 1962) was a Hungarian football player and manager. As well as being involved in football in his homeland, he also managed in Italy, Chile, Germany, Mexico, Peru, Argentina and Portugal. One of best footballers of his generation, György Orth was an attacking midfielder and forward renowned for his technique and pace. He also appeared in the football tournament at the 1924 Summer Olympics.

== Playing career ==
Orth started his playing career off with hometown side Vasas, before first experiencing Italian football with a spell at Pisa. Before retirement from playing Orth returned to Budapest in the form of a move to MTK Budapest. He was an important player for the Hungary national team in the interwar era but a serious knee injury suffered in 1926 stymied his playing career.

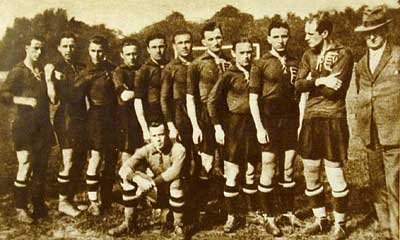
1924 Magyar team; Károly Fogl, Zoltán Opata, Ferenc Hirzer, Rudolf Jeny, József Eisenhoffer, Béla Guttmann, Gyula Mándi, Gábor Obitz, József Braun, György Orth, János Biri, and Gyula Kiss
