= Max Gold =

Austrian footballer (1900–1961)

Personal information
- Full name: Maximilian Gold
- Date of birth: November 22, 1900
- Place of birth: Vienna, Austria
- Date of death: November 27, 1961 (aged 61)
- Place of death: Tehran, Iran
- Position: Right full back

Senior career*
| Years | Team | Apps | (Gls) |
| 1919–1922 | Wiener AF | | |
| 1922–1924 | Hakoah Vienna | | |
| 1924 | Makkabi Tallinn | | |
| 1924–1927 | Hakoah Vienna | | |
| 1927–1928 | New York Giants | 28 | (0) |
| 1928–1929 | Wiener AC | | |
| 1929–1930 | Hakoah All-Stars | 18 | (0) |

International career
| 1922 | Austria | 2 | (0) |

Managerial career
- 1925: Makkabi Kaunas
- Maccabi Chicago
- * Club domestic league appearances and goals

Max Gold (born Vienna, Austria; died Tehran, Iran) was an early twentieth century Austrian football (soccer) right full back who played professionally in Austria and the United States. He also earned two caps with the Austria national football team in 1922.

== Player ==
=== Club career ===
Gold began his career with Wiener AF, gaining entry into the first team during the 1919–1920 season. He won the 1922 Austrian Cup with Wiener. In the fall of 1922, Gold transferred to Hakoah Vienna. In the summer of 1924 he played for Makkabi Tallinn in Estonia. He was back with Hakoah in the fall and won the 1924–1925 league title with them. In 1927, Gold moved to the New York Giants of the American Soccer League following a Hakoah Vienna tour of the United States. In 1928, the owner of the Giants, Charles Stoneham, instrumental in kicking off the “Soccer Wars” which resulted in FIFA declaring the ASL and Giants “outlaws”. Gold returned to Austria and spent the 1928–1929 season with Wiener AC. By 1929, the Soccer Wars had been resolved and in August 1929, he moved back to the ASL to play for the Hakoah All-Stars. An injury suffered during the season led to the end of his playing career.

=== National team ===
In 1922, Gold earned two caps with the Austria national football team. The first was a 1–1 tie with Hungary followed by a 7–1 victory over Switzerland.

== Coach ==
Following his retirement from playing, Gold embarked on a career as team owner and manager. He had briefly coached Makkabi Kaunas in Estonia during the summer 1925. He now became the owner and manager of Maccabi Chicago and later coached in Luxembourg and Vienna.
