= Coupe des Nations =

1930 football tournament in Switzerland

- Organiser(s): (Switzerland) Servette FC
- Founded: 1930
- Abolished: 1930; 96 years ago
- Region: Europe
- Teams: 10
- Related competitions: Small Club World Cup
- Last champions: (Kingdom of Hungary) Újpest

Coupe des Nations 1930 (English: Cup of Nations) was a football tournament in the summer of 1930 in Geneva, Switzerland, organized by local club Servette FC. Servette had just won the Swiss championship, and organized this event as a counterpoint to the first FIFA World Cup held at the same time in Uruguay, to which only few European countries (Belgium, France, Romania and Yugoslavia) sent a team. The tournament also marked the inauguration of the Stade des Charmilles.

Some people regard this competition as a predecessor of UEFA Champions League, since it was the first organized competition for the national champion teams in Europe. The champions of all major European football nations of the pre-war years were invited, except for the British Home Nations, who were withdrawn from FIFA at the time.

The competition was won by Hungarian Újpest FC who scored 16 goals and conceded only 1 in 4 games. After winning the Coupe des Nations trophy, Újpest declared themselves 'Champion of the Champions'.

In later years several attempts were made to create a tournament for the Champions of Europe. North-Italian cities were planning to host the competition in 1931, but it was abandoned due to financial reasons. Finally in 1937, during the Paris Expo a tournament was held as a successor of the Geneva tournament, but only two champion teams accepted the invitation. After the tournament Zürich, as the host of the 1939 Expo and Rome, the 1942 host made attempts to create the tournament, but both city's attempts failed. The next time that the major European champions were called together was after the 1954 creation of UEFA who started the European Cup in 1955.

== Participants ==
- (Austria) First Vienna FC (cup winners 1928–29 and 1929–30; 3rd in league 1929–30)
- (France) FC Sète (cup winners 1929–30)
- (Kingdom of Italy) AGC Bologna (national champions 1928–29)
- (Netherlands) Go Ahead (national champions 1929–30)
- (Spain) Real Unión Irún (cup winners 1927; 6th in league 1929–30)
- (Switzerland) Servette FC (national champions 1929–30)
- (Belgium) R. CS Brugeois (national champions 1929–30)
- (Czechoslovakia) Slavia Prague (national champions 1929–30)
- (Germany) SpVgg Fürth (national champions 1929)
- (Kingdom of Hungary) Újpest FC (national champions 1929–30 and Mitropa Cup winner 1929)

Notes:

- Apparently Real Unión Irún were announced as Spanish champions 1929, which is certainly wrong (they were 9th in the league 1929 and eliminated in the 1/16 finals of the domestic cup in 1928–29).
- Both Bologna and Irún had been allowed to field some players not signed with the club.
- The Greek and Norwegian FAs sent protest letters because their champions had not been invited.
- The tournament was supposed to have 12 participants, but Sheffield Wednesday, the English champions, were not invited because they were withdrawn from FIFA, and S.L. Benfica, the Portuguese champions, rejected the invitation.
- Bologna arrived too late at the tournament, so the match versus Go Ahead was after the first game of the quarterfinals. The loser of the match received a bye to the next round.

== First round ==
Date	Team #1	Result	Team #2
28 June	Servette (Switzerland)	0 – 7	(Austria) First Vienna
29 June	Séte (France)	3 – 4 (aet)	(Germany) Fürth
29 June	Slavia (Czechoslovakia)	4 – 2	(Belgium) Cercle Brugge
30 June	Újpest (Kingdom of Hungary)	3 – 1	(Spain) Irún
2 July	Go Ahead (Netherlands)	0 – 4	(Kingdom of Italy) Bologna

== Consolation round (losers first round) ==
Date	Team #1	Result	Team #2
1 July	Servette (Switzerland)	2 – 1	(Belgium) Cercle Brugge
1 July	Irún (Spain)	5 – 1	(France) Sète

(Losing teams eliminated, winners progress to quarterfinals)

== Quarter-finals ==
Date	Team #1	Result	Team #2
2 July	First Vienna (Austria)	7 – 1	(Germany) Fürth
3 July	Go Ahead (Netherlands)	0 – 7	(Kingdom of Hungary) Újpest
3 July	Irún (Spain)	1 – 2	(Czechoslovakia) Slavia
4 July	Servette (Switzerland)	4 – 1	(Kingdom of Italy) Bologna

== Semi-finals ==
Date	Team #1	Result	Team #2
5 July	Újpest (Kingdom of Hungary)	3 – 0	(Switzerland) Servette
5 July	First Vienna (Austria)	1 – 3	(Czechoslovakia) Slavia

== Third place match ==
Date	Team #1	Result	Team #2
6 July	First Vienna (Austria)	5 – 1	(Switzerland) Servette

== Final ==
Date	Team #1	Result	Team #2
6 July	Újpest (Kingdom of Hungary)	3 – 0	(Czechoslovakia) Slavia

=== Match details ===
Coupe des Nations Final
6 July 1930

Újpest (Kingdom of Hungary)	3–0	(Czechoslovakia) Slavia Prague
János Köves 25', 64', 77'	Report

Stade des Charmilles, Geneva
Attendance: 22,000
Referee: Stanley Rous (England)

Újpest
Slavia Prague

GK	(Kingdom of Hungary) János Aknai
DF	(Kingdom of Hungary) Gyula Dudás
DF	(Kingdom of Hungary) József Fogl III (c)
MF	(Kingdom of Hungary) Ferenc Borsányi
MF	(Kingdom of Hungary) Béla Volentik
MF	(Kingdom of Hungary) János Víg
FW	(Romania) (Kingdom of Hungary) Albert Ströck
FW	(Romania) (Kingdom of Hungary) István Avar
FW	(Kingdom of Hungary) János Köves
FW	(Kingdom of Hungary) Illés Spitz
FW	(Kingdom of Hungary) Gábor P. Szabó
Manager:
(Kingdom of Hungary) Lajos Bányai

GK	(Czechoslovakia) František Plánička
DF	(Czechoslovakia) Adolf Fiala
DF	(Czechoslovakia) Antonín Novák
MF	(Czechoslovakia) Antonín Vodička
MF	(Czechoslovakia) Adolf Šimperský
MF	(Czechoslovakia) Václav Šubrt
FW	(Czechoslovakia) František Junek
FW	(Czechoslovakia) Jindřich Šoltys
FW	(Czechoslovakia) František Svoboda (c)
FW	(Czechoslovakia) Antonín Puč
FW	(Czechoslovakia) Václav Bára
Manager:
(Scotland) John William Madden

== Final classification ==
- 1. Újpest
- 2. Slavia
- 3. First Vienna
- 4. Servette
- 5–8. Irún, Bologna, Fürth and Go Ahead
- 9–10. Cercle Brugge and Sète

== See also ==
- Tournoi international de l'Exposition Universelle de Paris
