= 1957 National Challenge Cup =

- Dewar Challenge Cup

Tournament details
- Country: United States

Final positions
- Champions: St. Louis Kutis S.C. (1st title)
- Runners-up: New York Hakoah

The 1957 National Challenge Cup was the 44th edition of the United States Soccer Football Association's annual open soccer championship.
