= David Bolchover =

British writer

- Education: London School of Economics
- Occupations: Author and commentator
- Website: davidbolchover.com

David Bolchover is a British author and commentator. The focus of his writing has ranged from the modern workplace to football. His most recent book The Greatest Comeback, a biography of the football coach and Holocaust survivor Bela Guttmann, was shortlisted for the William Hill Sports Book of the Year award.

== Theory ==
In his management writing capacity, he is known for his criticism of the abuse of the concept of “talent” in the workplace, which he believes has been designed to raise the pay of eminently replaceable but well-positioned employees. He has also set out the theory that artificially high remuneration in the finance sector and in the upper reaches of the corporate world is detrimental to innovation, as the pursuit of risk-free wealth is seen by many employees to be preferable to the perils of entrepreneurship. In his book, "Pay Check", he expounds and further develops these ideas, concluding that capitalism has been captured by a new “talent” class of employees, who extract the lion's share of the rewards within the system without contributing anything new or taking any risk.

== Research and influence ==
In his biography of Bela Guttmann, Bolchover established previously unknown details about what happened to him during the Holocaust. He has also carried out research on the Jewish international footballers murdered in the Holocaust.

Much of Bolchover's research on management has focused on professional sports. He has written that the greater transparency and meritocracy of sport has created higher management standards than in the corporate world.

Bolchover also coined the term “The Living Dead” to describe demotivated, disengaged employees, a group he believes is much larger than generally recognised.

== Books ==
- The Greatest Comeback (2017)
- Pay Check (2010)
- The Living Dead (2005)
- The 90-Minute Manager (2002)
