= Siegfried Wortmann =

Austrian footballer (1907–1951)

Personal information
- Date of birth: 18 February 1907
- Place of birth: Vienna, Austria
- Date of death: 21 December 1951 (aged 44)
- Place of death: Manhattan, New York, USA
- Position: Inside forward

Senior career*
Years	Team	Apps	(Gls)
1923–1927	Hakoah Vienna		
1927–1929	New York Nationals	26	(12)
1929–1931	Hakoah All-Stars	96	(28)
1931–	First Vienna		
–1936	Brookhattan		

International career
1926	Austria	1	(1)
- * Club domestic league appearances and goals

Siegfried Wortmann (later Wortman; 18 February 1907 – 21 December 1951) was an Austrian football (soccer) inside forward who played professionally in Austria and the United States. He also earned one cap, scoring a goal, with the Austria national team in 1926.

Wortmann began his career with Hakoah Vienna as a youth player, but began seeing first team time during the 1923–1924 season. In 1924, he became a first team regular as Hakaoh won the 1925 Austrian League title. In 1926, Hakoah toured the United States. Impressed by the high pay and relatively low anti-Semitism compared to the Austrian league, Wortmann and several of his teammates moved to the American Soccer League. In 1927, he signed with the New York Nationals, winning the 1928 National Challenge Cup with the Nationals. Wortmann scored the lone Nationals goal in the 1-1 first game tie with Ben Millers. In the replay, Wortmann again scored as the Nationals easily disposed of the Ben Millers, 3–0. In 1929, he moved to the Hakoah All-Stars, playing four seasons with them. As the ASL began to collapse in 1931, Wortmann returned to Austria to sign with First Vienna FC, winning the 1932–1933 Austrian League title. He returned to the United States in 1933, this time permanently, and joined Brookhattan of the second American Soccer League, playing until his retirement in 1936. After his retirement, he owned a clothing store in the United States.

== National team ==
Wortmann earned his lone cap with the Austria national team in a 2–1 win over Czechoslovakia on September 18, 1926. He scored Austria's second, and game-winning, goal.

== Later life ==
Wortmann, who was Jewish, later worked as a garment salesman in New York. He changed the spelling of his name to Wortman when applying for citizenship in 1935. He married Frieda Roth in Austria in 1933, prior to moving to the United States. They had a son, Allan Sheldon (Pomerance) Wortman, born in New York in 1938. He died in Manhattan, only 44.
