= József Fogl =

Hungarian footballer

Personal information
- Native name: Fogl József
- Other names: József Fogoly, József Újpesti, Fogl III
- National team: Hungarian National Football Team (Magyar Labdarúgó-válogatott)
- Born: 14 August 1897 Újpest, Austria-Hungary
- Died: 6 February 1971 (aged 73) Budapest, Hungary
- Relative: Károly Fogl II (sibling) Ferenc Fogl (sibling)

Sport
- Sport: Association football
- Position: Captain
- Team: Újpest FC (1918–1931)

Achievements and titles
- Regional finals: 1929 Mitropa Cup; 1930 Coupe des Nations
- National finals: Hungarian League 1929–30, 1930–31

József Fogl, also known as József Fogoly, József Újpesti and Fogl III (14 August 1897 – 6 February 1971) was a Hungarian footballer who played for Újpest FC, as well as representing the Hungary national football team.

Fogl was born in Újpest, Austria-Hungary. Between 1920 and 1930 he played 37 games for the Hungary national team as a left defender. Together with his older brother, Károly Fogl II, the two Fogls formed the legendary "Fogl-gate" (Fogl-gát in Hungarian), an extremely powerful and tough defending formation for more than a decade.

Fogl III won the 1929 Mitropa Cup and the 1930 Coupe des Nations as well as the 1929–30 and 1930–31 season with Újpest, being the captain of the team on all occasions. Fogl and his brother also played on the Hungarian football team in the 1924 Summer Olympics, placing 10th. He died in Budapest on 6 February 1971.
