= János Aknai =

Hungarian footballer (1908–1992)

Personal information
- Full name: János Aknai Acht
- Date of birth: 1908
- Place of birth: Budapest, Austria-Hungary
- Date of death: 1992 (aged 83–84)
- Position: Goalkeeper

Senior career*
Years	Team	Apps	(Gls)
1928–1933	Újpest	54	(0)
1933–1934	US Tourcoing		
1934–1935	Valencia	1	(0)
1940–1942	Marseille	16	(0)

International career
1929–1932	Hungary	10	(0)
- * Club domestic league appearances and goals

János Aknai Acht (1908–1992), also referred to as Eugène Acht or Paul Acht, was a Hungarian footballer who played as a goalkeeper. At club level, he played for both Újpest FC in his native country, for US Tourcoing, Red Star, and Marseille in France, and for Valencia in Spain. He represented the Hungary national team at international level.

== Career ==
Aknai played 54 matches for Újpest FC, winning the Mitropa Cup 1929 and the Coupe des Nations 1930. He then moved to France, first with US Tourcoing.

He had a short spell with Valencia CF, and came back to France where he played for Red Star in 1935–36 (14 matches) and Olympique de Marseille.
