= Alois Hess =

Austrian footballer (1903–1956)

Alois Hess אלואיס הס
Personal information
- Date of birth: 3 January 1903
- Place of birth: Austria
- Date of death: 3 July 1956 (aged 53)
- Place of death: Tel Aviv, Israel

Senior career*
Years	Team	Apps	(Gls)
1919–1934	Hakoah Wien		
1934–1937	Maccabi Tel Aviv		

International career
	Austria	4	

Managerial career
- 1936–1937: Maccabi Tel Aviv
- 1937–1947: Beitar Tel Aviv
- 1949: Israel
- 1954–1956: Beitar Tel Aviv
- * Club domestic league appearances and goals

Lajos Alois Hess (Hebrew: לאיוש אלואיס הס; 1903–1956) was an Austrian footballer who played for Hakoah Vienna and Maccabi Tel Aviv.

== Career ==
Hess started playing for Hakoah Vienna in 1919 was part of the squad that beat West Ham United in London, scoring the third goal of the match, as well as being part of the team that toured North America in 1927 and 1929.

Hess emigrated to Mandatory Palestine in 1934, joining Maccabi Tel Aviv, as well as serving as the team's manager. In 1937 Hess was appointed as manager of the newly formed Beitar Tel Aviv, a position he held until 1947.

In 1949, Hess was appointed as manager of the Israel national team ahead of the national team's 1950 FIFA World Cup qualification campaign. In his first match as manager of the national team, against Cyprus, Israel recorded its first victory as independent country (having previously beaten Lebanon as Mandatory Palestine in 1940), beating its rivals 3–1. The national team was beaten in both qualification matches by Yugoslavia, and Hess left the position.

Hess returned to Beitar Tel Aviv in 1954, as the team was at risk of relegation to Liga Bet He died in Tel Aviv on 3 July 1956 during a practice.
