= North Jersey Soccer League =

- Founded: 1990
- Country: United States
- Confederation: US Soccer
- Divisions: 26
- Level on pyramid: 5
- Promotion to: None
- Relegation to: None
- Domestic cup(s): Lamar Hunt U.S. Open Cup
- Current champions: New Jersey Lions
- Website: http://www.northjerseysoccerleague.com/

The North Jersey Soccer League is a defunct United States Adult Soccer Association-affiliated league that operated in Northern New Jersey.
