= Ásványráró =

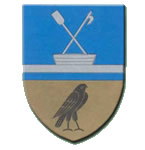
- Flag Coat of arms

- Location of Győr-Moson-Sopron county in Hungary

- Location of Ásványráró
- Coordinates: 47.8313°N 17.49678°E
- Country: Hungary
- County: Győr-Moson-Sopron

Government
  - Mayor: Popp Rita (Ind.)

Area
  - Total: 39.11 km^{2} (15.10 sq mi)

Population (2022)
  - Total: 2,098
  - Density: 53.64/km^{2} (138.9/sq mi)
- Time zone: UTC+1 (CET)
  - Summer (DST): UTC+2 (CEST)
- Postal code: 9177
- Area code: 96
- Website: Official page of Ásványráró

Ásványráró is a village in Győr-Moson-Sopron County, Hungary.

== Location ==
Ásványráró lies the central part of Szigetköz, next to the Danube, between Győr and Mosonmagyaróvár. In 1936, the two villages of Ásvány and Ráró were united.

== Sightseeing ==
- At the end of the village nearest to Dunaszeg, is the famous "Kálvária". Count Lázár Apponyi built it in Baroque style in 1738.
- Near the "Kálvária", there stands the monument of the victims of World War II. József Somogyi (famous sculptor) carved out.
- Near to Kálvária stands an old black aspen tree. It is 100 years old. Protected natural values. The diameter is ~550 cm.
- Because most of the villagers are Roman Catholic (c. 96%), there are two (so-called) búcsú, of the village's churches. In Ásvány there is a church named for St. Andrew. It is 136 m^{2} from the 14th century. In Ráró there is a church named for St. Roch which is from the 17th century.

== Twin towns – sister cities ==
Ásványráró is twinned with:

- Unterwaltersdorf, Austria (in the town of Ebreichsdorf)
- Tysaashvan, Ukraine
