= 1924–25 Austrian First League =

14th season of top-tier football league in Austria

Austrian First League
- Season: 1924–25
- Champions: Hakoah Vienna (1st Austrian title)
- Matches: 100
- Goals: 411 (4.11 per match)
- Top goalscorer: Gustav Wieser (19 goals)

The 1924–25 Austrian First League season was the fourteenth season of top-tier football in Austria. It was contested by 11 teams playing a 20-game season. Hakoah Vienna's goalkeeper scored the championship-winning goal against Wiener AC. This was also the first year in which professionalism was introduced to the league.

== League standings ==
| Pos | Team | Pld | W | D | L | GF | GA | GD | Pts |
|---|---|---|---|---|---|---|---|---|---|
| 1 | Hakoah Vienna | 20 | 10 | 6 | 4 | 43 | 30 | +13 | 26 |
| 2 | SV Amateure | 20 | 10 | 4 | 6 | 36 | 28 | +8 | 24 |
| 3 | First Vienna FC | 20 | 9 | 5 | 6 | 41 | 32 | +9 | 23 |
| 4 | SK Rapid Wien | 20 | 9 | 5 | 6 | 49 | 39 | +10 | 23 |
| 5 | Wiener AC | 20 | 8 | 7 | 5 | 42 | 37 | +5 | 23 |
| 6 | SK Admira Wien | 20 | 8 | 6 | 6 | 39 | 30 | +9 | 22 |
| 7 | SC Wacker | 20 | 6 | 8 | 6 | 34 | 36 | −2 | 20 |
| 8 | 1. Simmeringer SC | 20 | 7 | 4 | 9 | 43 | 44 | −1 | 18 |
| 9 | Wiener Sportclub | 20 | 6 | 5 | 9 | 32 | 35 | −3 | 17 |
| 10 | SK Slovan HAC | 20 | 5 | 7 | 8 | 31 | 42 | −11 | 17 |
| 11 | SpC Rudolfshügel | 20 | 2 | 3 | 15 | 21 | 58 | −37 | 7 |

Source: rsssf.com

== Results ==
| Home \ Away | ADM | AMA | FIR | HAK | RAP | RUD | SIM | SLO | WAK | WAC | SPO |
|---|---|---|---|---|---|---|---|---|---|---|---|
| SK Admira Wien | | 3–1 | 3–3 | 1–3 | 0–3 | 2–0 | 0–3 | 3–0 | 4–0 | 3–1 | 1–2 |
| SV Amateure | 3–1 | | 2–1 | 0–3 | 1–3 | 5–0 | 3–1 | 2–0 | 1–1 | 0–2 | 1–1 |
| First Vienna | 0–2 | 1–1 | | 1–3 | 2–0 | 4–2 | 6–1 | 2–2 | 4–3 | 1–0 | 2–4 |
| Hakoah Vienna | 0–2 | 0–1 | 1–3 | | 4–1 | 2–0 | 1–1 | 3–1 | 2–2 | 4–3 | 3–1 |
| SK Rapid Wien | 3–0 | 3–0 | 1–1 | 1–1 | | 4–2 | 4–4 | 1–1 | 3–5 | 3–3 | 2–1 |
| SpC Rudolfshügel | 1–1 | 0–0 | 0–2 | 3–3 | 2–3 | | 1–4 | 1–2 | 3–1 | 1–7 | 1–3 |
| Simmeringer SC | 1–1 | 2–3 | 2–3 | 3–3 | 5–4 | 4–0 | | 3–2 | 0–1 | 2–3 | 3–0 |
| SK Slovan HAC | 1–1 | 1–4 | 2–1 | 3–2 | 2–4 | 2–3 | 2–1 | | 1–1 | 3–2 | 2–2 |
| SC Wacker | 3–3 | 2–5 | 1–0 | 0–1 | 2–1 | 3–1 | 3–0 | 2–2 | | 1–1 | 0–1 |
| Wiener AC | 0–6 | 2–1 | 1–1 | 1–1 | 2–1 | 2–0 | 4–2 | 2–2 | 2–2 | | 1–1 |
| Wiener Sportclub | 2–2 | 1–2 | 1–3 | 2–3 | 1–4 | 4–0 | 0–1 | 2–0 | 1–1 | 2–3 | |

Legend: Blue = home team win; Yellow = draw; Red = away team win.
