= 1928–29 National Challenge Cup =

- Dewar Challenge Cup

Tournament details
- Country: United States
- Dates: December 16, 1928 – April 7, 1929

Final positions
- Champions: New York Hakoah (1st title)
- Runners-up: St. Louis Madison Kennel
- Semifinalists: Sparta ABA; New York Giants

The 1928–29 National Challenge Cup was the annual open cup held by the United States Football Association now known as the Lamar Hunt U.S. Open Cup. This edition of the soccer tournament featured 100 entrants (51 in the East and 49 in the West). In this edition the Western bracket played the first round in December 1928 while the Eastern section chose to wait out the poor weather and began the first-round games in February 1929. The Cup final, which drew 21,583 spectators, broke the record for the largest crowd to see a Cup final, and remained the largest crowd, until 2010, when the Seattle Sounders FC defeat Columbus Crew in front of 31,311 spectators.

== Eastern Division ==
First round
February 3 - Bronx
New York Hakoah	7
Mamaroneck F.C.	1
February 3 - Rochester
Rochester Celtic	3
Buffalo Hungarian	2
February 3 - Newark
Newark Portuguese	3
Bayonne Rovers	0
February 3
New York Hungaria	w/o
First German
February 3 - Bronx
New York Giants	4
IRT Rangers	1
February 3 - Trenton
Trenton F.C.	8
Newark Skeeters	1
February 3 - Baltimore
Canton F.C.	0
Bethlehem Steel	5
February 3 - Waterbury
Waterbury	1
Walsh Chevrolet	6

Second round
February 17 - Bronx
New York Hakoah	6
Rochester Celtic	0
February 17 - Newark
Newark Portuguese	4
New York Hungaria	1
February 24 - Bronx
New York Giants	8
Trenton F.C.	0
February 16 - Bethlehem
Bethlehem Steel	5
Walsh Chevrolet	0

Semi-finals
March 17 - Bronx
New York Hakoah	3
Newark Portuguese	2
March 3, 9
New York Giants	2-6
Bethlehem Steel	2-3

Final
March 24 - Brooklyn
New York Hakoah	1
New York Giants	0

== Western Division ==
First round
December 23 - Chicago
Thistle F.C.	1
Olympia F.C.	1
December 16 - St. Louis
Madison Kennel	4
Ben Millers	1
December 16 - Detroit
Holley Carburetor	2
Flint IMA	0
December 16 - Cleveland
Goodyear F.C.	2
Gold Bond American Hungarian F.C.	0
December 16 - Chicago
Sparta ABA	3
Carpenters	0
December 23 - Detroit
Wood Hydraulic	1
All Scots	3
December 30 - Chicago
Bricklayers	2
Buda AA	0
December 23 - St. Louis
Tablers	5
Wellston	2

Second round
February 17
Thistle F.C.	1
Madison Kennel	5
February 23 - Detroit
Holley Carburetor	10
Goodyear F.C.	3
February 24 - Chicago
Sparta ABA	7
All Scots	0
February 17 - Chicago
Bricklayers	3
Tablers	1

Semi-finals
March 10 - St. Louis
Madison Kennel	5
Holley Carburetor	1
March 3 - Chicago
Sparta ABA	3
Bricklayers	1

Final
March 17 - St. Louis
Madison Kennel	7
Sparta ABA	4

== Final ==
March 31, 1929

St. Louis Madison Kennel (MO)	0–2	New York Hakoah (NY)
		Eisenhoffer 80'; Wortmann 82'

Sportsman's Park, St. Louis, Missouri
Attendance: 15,000
Referee: James McFarlane (USA)
April 7, 1929

New York Hakoah (NY)	3–0	St. Louis Madison Kennel (MO)
Schwarz 20'; Grünwald 50'; Häusler 70'

Dexter Park, Woodhaven, New York
Attendance: 21,583
Referee: James McFarlane (USA)

== See also ==
- American Soccer Association Cup

== Sources ==
- Jose, Colin (1998). American Soccer League, 1921-1931 (Hardback). The Scarecrow Press. (ISBN 0-8108-3429-4).
