= Hakoah Vienna =

- Full name: Sport Club Hakoah Wien
- Founded: 1909; 117 years ago 1945; 81 years ago
- Dissolved: 1938; 88 years ago 1949; 77 years ago (football)
Home colours	Away colours

Sport Club Hakoah Wien (Hakoah means "the strength" in Hebrew) is a Jewish sports club in Vienna, Austria.

Before the World War II, it produced several Olympic athletes and was notable for fielding an entirely Jewish association football team. Closed by the Nazis in 1938 following the Anschluss, it re-formed in 1945.

== History ==
=== 1909–1919 ===
A pair of Austrian Zionists, cabaret librettist (Kabarettist) Fritz "Beda" Löhner and dentist Ignaz Herman Körner and some others founded the club in 1909. Influenced by Max Nordau's doctrine of "Muscular Judaism" (German: Muskeljudentum), they named the club "Hakoah" (Hebrew: הכח), meaning "the strength" or "the power" in Hebrew. In its first year, the club's athletes competed in fencing, football, field hockey, track & field, wrestling and swimming.

Hakoah Vienna was one of the first football teams to market themselves globally by travelling frequently, where they would attract thousands of Jewish fans to their matches against local teams in cities such as London and New York. Support for Hakoah rapidly spread around Europe, and Jews as far as Russia and the United States avidly supported Hakoah Vienna, which took advantage of such support by setting up very successful tours and friendlies. As the first "Jewish" team, Hakoah attracted the attention of prominent Jewish figures, including author Franz Kafka. In the offseason, Hakoah traveled around the world marketing their success. In preparation for their visits, they sent promoters ahead of the team to generate buzz and attract Jewish fans. Hakoah was not new to global tours; the organization's other teams, like swimming and wrestling, had already traveled around the world and won a collection of medals. However, the team, and their fans, regularly faced anti-Semitism during games. The club created an unconventional form of security, having the Hakoah wrestling team accompany them and act as their personal bodyguards.

=== 1920s ===
From 1922, Hakoah leased a sports ground in the Vienna Prater park. The facilities included an athletics track, a sports stadium, football and handball pitches with seating for 25,000 spectators, tennis courts, a jumping pit, a hockey field, cloakrooms and showers, a dining area, and groundkeepers' accommodation. Hakoah finished second in the Austrian League in 1922.

Béla Guttmann played for the team as their centre back from 1922 to 1926 and in 1933. Following a tour of the United States, Guttmann, Hakoah's most prominent player, and several of his teammates decided to stay in the US.

In the 1920s, footballer Max Scheuer played for and captained Hakoah Vienna. With the team, he won the Austrian championship in the 1924–25 Austrian First League season, the first professional Austrian football title.

In 1927, he and the team came to the United States to play the Bethlehem Steel Football Club, defending U.S. champion and 1926-27 champion of the American Soccer League. During the Holocaust, Scheuer was sent to the Auschwitz concentration camp in Poland, where he was killed in the early 1940s. Scheuer was one of at least seven Hakoah footballers killed in the Holocaust. Others were Josef Kolisch, Ali Schönfeld, Oskar Grasgrün, Ernst Horowitz, and the brothers Erwin Pollak and Oskar Pollak.

On the team's trip to London in 1923, they defeated West Ham United by a score of 5–1, admittedly against a largely reserve team. Nevertheless, Hakoah became the first continental club to defeat an English team in England.

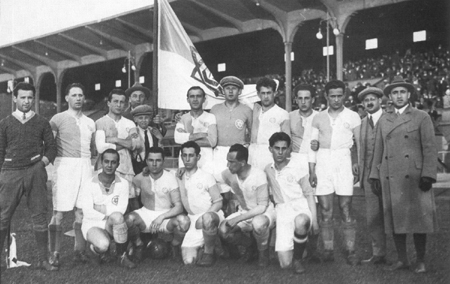
Hakoah Vienna football team, 1925

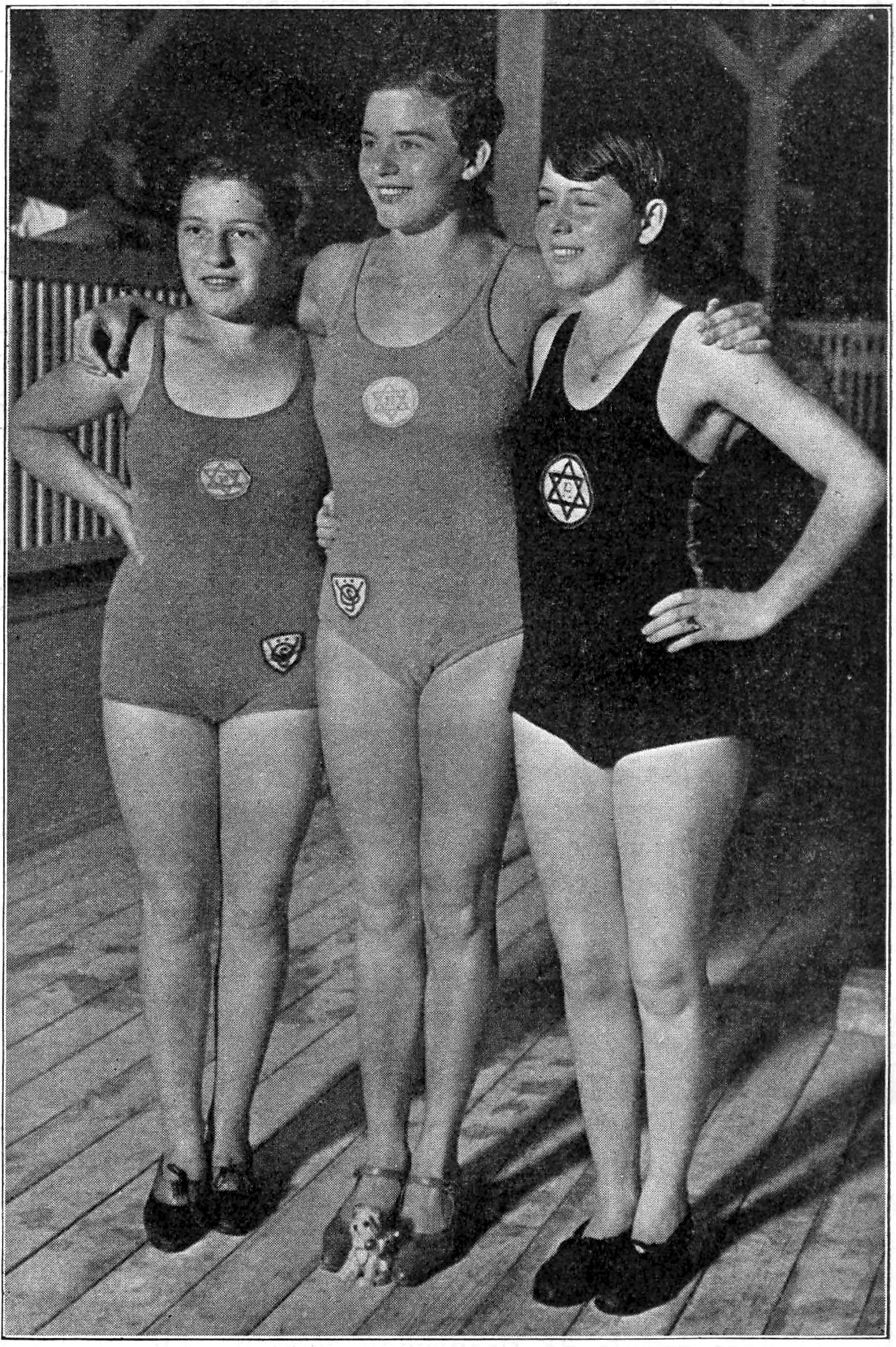
Hakoah Vienna swimmers Fritzi Löwy, Hedy Bienenfeld, and Idy Kohn (1927).

In a dramatic 1924–25 season game, Hakoah's Hungarian-born goalkeeper Alexander Fabian broke his arm. The rules at the time did not allow substitutions, so Fabian put his arm in a sling and switched positions with a forward. Seven minutes later, Fabian scored the winning goal, clinching Hakoah's league championship.

In 1926, the team conducted a highly successful tour of the United States. Their game at New York City's Polo Grounds attracted 46,000 spectators, a record at the time. Many of the team's players, impressed by the relative lack of anti-Semitism, decided to stay in the United States, accepting offers to play for American clubs. Several of these players formed the New York Hakoah club, which won the National Challenge Cup in 1929.

=== 1930s ===
A few players emigrated to Mandate Palestine and founded the Hakoah Tel Aviv football club there. The loss of so many talented players effectively ended the Austrian football team's competitiveness.

The athletic club's success extended beyond the football pitch. Hakoah had highly successful sections in wrestling, fencing, water polo, athletics and swimming, with the club producing several Olympic athletes, especially in women's swimming. The club had its orchestra and organised balls and other social events. At its pre-war peak, the club had over 8000 members. Watermarks, a 2004 documentary film, tells the story of the Hakoah women's swim team with historical footage from the 1930s and contemporary interviews with surviving team members.

The club president from 1928 to 1938 was David (known as Dezsö) Herbst, the husband of Austria's tennis champion, Liesl Herbst. He wrote in the celebratory Festschrift (brochure) on the 25th anniversary of the club in 1934:

"In the days of our forefathers, we Jews have completely forgotten the old and true words in the education of our children: Mens sana in corpore sano! We only thought that the new generation should be educated, we neglected what today the world recognises as the only proper educational principle: to make our bodies strong."

By the 1930s, Hakoah Vienna was on the receiving end of hatred stirred up by Hitler, and had to travel to matches with their wrestlers as bodyguards. Three days after the Anschluss, the shared club base of Hakoah Sports Club, Hakoah Tourism and Ski Club and the Hakoah Swimming Club at the Viennese Cafe Atlashof was shut down, with the club assets and stadium seized. The official dissolution of the sports club was administered in the political department IV Ac by the Liquidation Commissioner of the Nazi party. Dezsö Herbst did most of the official work with the Liquidation Commissioner. On 31 March 1938, the liquidator ordered the club to declare and transfer its assets. After the transfer, the final phase of the 'development' of Hakoah began. On 16 November 1938, the Liquidation Commissioner sent an application to the Board of the Vienna Police Directorate for a raid on Hakoah Sports Club.

After the Anschluss of 1938, the German Football Association banned the club and nullified their games. Their stadium was appropriated and given to the Nazi party. At least 38 athletes were killed in the Holocaust, although some others managed to escape to Mandatory Palestine.

=== Since 1945 ===
The club was founded again in 1945 and exists today. The football team, which played in the second division of the Austrian championship after World War II, became defunct in 1949.

In 2000, the Vienna Jewish community purchased the club's old fields within Prater Park for €10 million intending to build a new community center. As of 2006, the club had about 400 members and its football team plays in Austria's minor leagues under the name SC Maccabi Wien. The club opened its new home on 11 March 2008.

== Former players ==
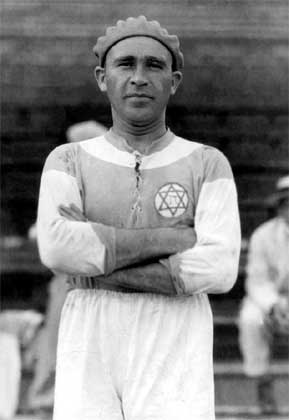
Béla Guttmann

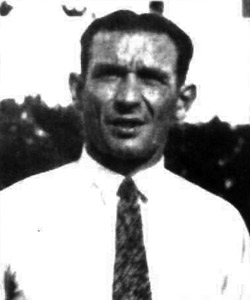
Heinrich Schönfeld

- Walter Beer
- Karl Duldig (1902–1986)
- József Eisenhoffer (1900–1945)
- Alexander Fabian
- Otto Fischer (1901–1941)
- Richard Fried
- Max Gold (1900–1961)
- Josef Grünfeld
- Max Grünwald
- Béla Guttmann (1899–1981)
- Moritz Häusler (1901–1951)
- "Fuss" Heinrich
- Alois Hess (1903–1956)
- Norbert Katz (1900–1979)
- Alexander Nemes-Neufeld (1899–1977)
- Egon Pollak (1898–1981)
- Samuel Posaner
- Benno Posaner
- Max Scheuer (1895–1941)
- Yochanan Schey
- Alfred Schönfeld
- Heinrich Schönfeld (1900–1976)
- Ernő Schwarz (1902–1977)
- Joseph Stross
- Jacob Wagner
- Max Wortmann
- Siegfried Wortmann (1907–1951)

== Selected former managers ==
- (Hungary) (Austria) Béla Guttmann (1932–33)

== Honours ==
- Austrian Championship: 1
  - 1924–25
- 2. Klasse A/II. Liga: 2
  - 1919–20, 1928–29

== See also ==
- Arthur Baar, founder of Hakoah's football club
- Hacoaj, a Jewish club named after Hakoah Vienna
- Hakoah Bergen County, a Jewish club named after Hakoah Vienna
- New York Hakoah, formed of former Vienna players then playing for the New York Giants
- Hakoah Amidar Ramat Gan
