= St. Louis Madison Kennel =

American soccer team based in St. Louis, Missouri

St. Louis Madison Kennel was a U.S. soccer team established in 1928 in St. Louis, Missouri. The team played in the St. Louis Soccer League for two seasons. Madison Kennel reached the final of the 1929 National Challenge Cup where they lost 5-0 on aggregate to New York Hakoah in a two-game, home and away series.

== Record ==
Year	Record	League	Open Cup
1928-29	7-5-5	2nd	Final
1929-30	4-6-4	4th	First Round
