= Brooklyn Hakoah =

Defunct American Basketball team based in Brooklyn, New York

Brooklyn Hakoah is a former United States soccer team club based in Brooklyn, New York, that played in the American Soccer League.

== Brooklyn Hakoah I ==
Originally formed by former players of SC Hakoah Wien, they played in the American Soccer League in 1929. They then merged with New York Hakoah of the ESL, to become Hakoah All-Stars.

=== Year-by-year ===
Year	Division	League	Reg. season	Playoffs	National Cup
Fall 1929	1	ASL	8th	No playoff	N/A

== Brooklyn Hakoah II ==
The name was revived during the 1948-49 ASL season when, after just one game, financial trouble caused the owners of the Brooklyn Wanderers to sell the club. New owners took over the team and renamed them the Brooklyn Hakoah. Just before the 1956-–57 season, the club merged with the New York Americans to form a new New York Hakoah.

=== Year-by-year ===
Year	Division	League	Reg. season	Playoffs	National Cup
1948/49	N/A	ASL	9th	Did not qualify	?
1949/50	N/A	ASL	4th	No playoff	?
1950/51	N/A	ASL	8th	No playoff	?
1951/52	N/A	ASL	7th	No playoff	?
1952/53	N/A	ASL	8th	No playoff	?
1953/54	N/A	ASL	5th	No playoff	?
1954/55	N/A	ASL	3rd	No playoff	?
1955/56	N/A	ASL	7th	No playoff	?
