= New York Hakoah =

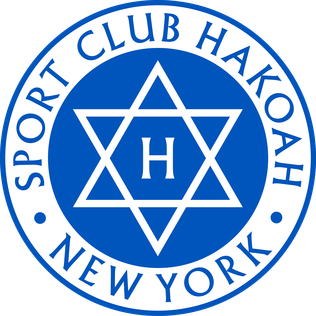
- Full name: Sport Club Hakoah New York
- Founded: 2009; 10 years ago
- Stadium: University Stadium
- Capacity: 250
- President: Abbie Wolanow
- Manager: Dov Glickman
- League: North Jersey Soccer League
- 2011–12: 4th
Home colors

Sport Club Hakoah New York (or New York Hakoah) is an American soccer club based in New York City, which takes its name from two earlier, defunct clubs.

Hakoah (roughly translated as "strength" from Hebrew) is a frequent name for sport and social Jewish clubs around the world, something linked with the original clubs' ties to the Jewish community.

== New York Hakoah I ==
Originally formed by former players from Hakoah Vienna, including Béla Guttmann and Rudolph Nickolsburger, they initially played in the Eastern Soccer League in the fall of 1928. In 1929 they won the 1929 National Challenge Cup, now known as the Lamar Hunt U.S. Open Cup.

In 1930 they merged with Brooklyn Hakoah of the American Soccer League to become the Hakoah All-Stars.

== New York Hakoah II ==
The name was revived just prior to the 1956–57 season when a revived Brooklyn Hakoah merged with New York Americans to become the New York Hakoah-Americans. They then became New York Hakoah for the 1962–63 season. They were American Soccer League champions three consecutive seasons: 1957 - 1959.

Kurt Lamm coached the team for 14 seasons, including their three consecutive American Soccer League Championships (1955/56 - 1957/58). He was ASL's Manager of the Year in the 1957–58 and 1962–63 seasons.

== New York Hakoah III ==
Originally called Sport Club Hakoah Bergen County, the modern club was established in 2009. Ron Glickman decided to try and rebuild the Hakoah club in the New York City suburb of Teaneck, New Jersey. Scouting for players was done via local college rosters and direct contact with college coaches. At the beginning of the 2011–2012 season, the club came to an agreement with Fairleigh Dickinson University to use University Stadium as the team's home field. Sponsorship agreements were also announced with a shirt sponsorship deal from El Al Israel Airlines in addition All Ways Travel and Data Life. Hakoah Bergen County joined the North Jersey Soccer League Premier West Division for the 2011/12 season where they finished in fourth place.

In August 2012, the club announced that they would re-brand and continue the legacy of New York Hakoah.

== Year-by-year ==
Season	Div.	League			National Cup
Season	Div.	Assoc.	Finish	Playoffs	National Cup
1928–29	N/A	ESL	2nd	No playoff	Champion
1929	N/A	ESL	2nd	No playoff	N/A
1956–57	N/A	ASL	1st	Champion (Note: No playoff held; team placed 1st. in the table was crowned champion.)	Runners-up
1957–58	N/A	ASL	1st	Champion	did not participate
1958–59	N/A	ASL	1st	Champion	Quarterfinals
1959–60	N/A	ASL	3rd	No playoff	did not participate
1960–61	N/A	ASL	3rd	No playoff	did not participate
1961–62	N/A	ASL	5th	No playoff	did not participate
1962–63	N/A	ASL	6th	No playoff	did not participate
1963–64	N/A	ASL	5th	No playoff	did not participate
2011–12 (Note: as "Hakoah Bergen County".)	US West	NJSL	4th	No playoff	did not participate
