= Hakoah All-Stars =

Hakoah All-Stars is a former United States soccer club, based in New York City, that played in the American Soccer League between 1930 and 1932. The club was formed after the merger of Brooklyn Hakoah of the ASL and New York Hakoah of the Eastern Soccer League. Both of these clubs were formed by former players from SC Hakoah Wien. Béla Guttmann played for the team.

== Year-by-year ==
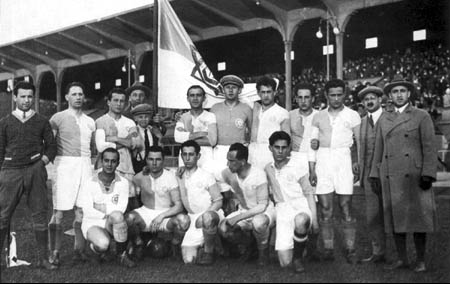
Hakoah All-Stars team of 1925

Year	Division	League	Reg. season	Playoffs	U.S. Open Cup
1930	1	ACL/ASL	3rd (Spring); 3rd (Fall)	No playoff	Second round
1931	1	ASL	6th (Spring); 4th (Fall)	Did not qualify	Fifth round
1932	1	ASL	2nd (Spring); 6th? (Fall)	No playoff	Quarterfinals
