= Gyula Kiss =

Hungarian footballer

Personal information
- Date of birth: 4 May 1916
- Place of birth: Budapest, Hungary
- Date of death: 12 December 1959 (aged 43)

Senior career*
Years	Team	Apps	(Gls)
- Ferencvárosi TC

International career
1935–1937	Hungary	2	(0)
- * Club domestic league appearances and goals

Gyula Kiss (4 May 1916 – 12 December 1959) was a Hungarian international football player. He was born in Budapest, and played for the club Ferencvárosi TC. He was part of the Hungary national football team at the 1936 Summer Olympics in Berlin.

Kiss later enjoyed a career as a manager. He managed Budapest Honvéd at the height of their success during the 1950s.
