= Rudolf Jeny =

Hungarian footballer and manager

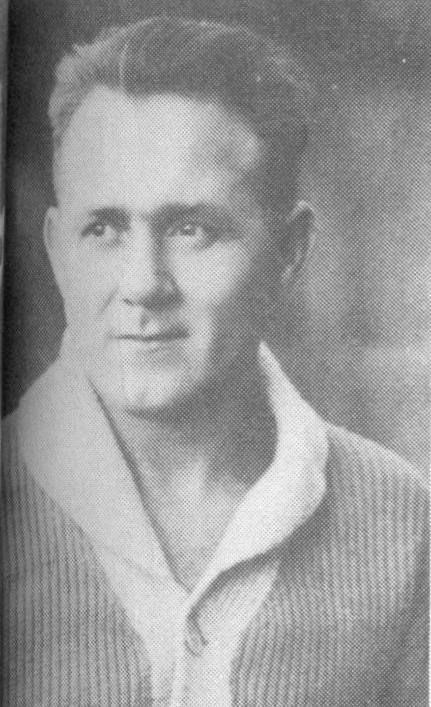

Personal information
- Date of birth: 2 March 1901
- Place of birth: Budapest, Austria-Hungary
- Date of death: 14 May 1975 (aged 74)
- Position: Forward

Senior career*
Years	Team	Apps	(Gls)
- Kispest AC
- MTK Budapest
1933–1934	Sporting CP		

International career
1919–1926	Hungary	20	(3)

Managerial career
- 1930–1933: Atlético Madrid
- 1933–1934: Sporting CP
- 1934–1935: Académica de Coimbra
- 1935: Jiul Petroșani
- 1945–1947: Jiul Petroșani
- 1951–1952: Vasas SC
- 1955: Győri ETO FC
- * Club domestic league appearances and goals

Rudolf Jeny (also spelt as Jenny, Jeney or Jenei; 2 March 1901 – 14 May 1975) was a Hungarian football player and manager.

== Career ==
=== Playing career ===
Jeny was born in Budapest. A forward, Jeny played club football for hometown side Kispest AC and MTK Budapest. He also represented the Hungary national side at the 1924 Summer Olympics, and earned a total of 20 caps for the team between 1919 and 1926.

=== Coaching career ===
Jeny managed Spanish side Atlético Madrid between 1930 and 1933, Portuguese side Sporting Clube de Portugal in 1933–34 and Győri ETO FC in 1955.
