= 2018 United States Soccer Federation presidential election =

Election

United States Soccer Federation presidential election, 2018
- February 10, 2018
| Candidate | Carlos Cordeiro | Kathy Carter | Kyle Martino |
| Percentage | 68.6 | 10.6 | 10.6 |
| Candidate | Eric Wynalda |
| Percentage | 8.9 |
President before election
Sunil Gulati
Elected President
Carlos Cordeiro

The 2018 United States Soccer Federation presidential election was held in February 2018 to determine the next President of the United States Soccer Federation. Having served as President since 2006, incumbent Sunil Gulati decided not to run for re-election, after the United States men's national soccer team failed to qualify for the FIFA World Cup for the first time since 1986.

== Background ==
Sunil Gulati, the incumbent president of U.S. Soccer, has held the position since he was first elected in 2006. Gulati ran unopposed for election in 2006, and for re-election in 2010 and 2014. On December 4, 2017, Gulati announced that he would not seek another term.

In the months leading up to the election, the U.S. Soccer Federation submitted a joint bid with Canada and Mexico to host the 2026 FIFA World Cup. In October 2017, the United States men's national soccer team failed to qualify for the 2018 FIFA World Cup, missing the World Cup for the first time since 1986, sparking a major push for reform by supporters.

== Format ==
The election took place on February 10, 2018, at the National Council Meeting during the U.S. Soccer Annual Meeting in Orlando, Florida. Candidates are required to pass a background check conducted by the federation and receive three letters of nomination from organization members or an athlete representative on the federation's Board of Directors.

Eligible delegates will be drawn from the following groups:

- The 91 state-level associations, national associations, and professional leagues
- Voting members of the Athletes Council
- Voting members of the Board of Directors
- Past presidents of the federation
- Life Members
- Delegates from national associations, national affiliates, other affiliates, and disabled service organizations
- Delegates selected by individual sustaining members

Votes are divided between the Athletes Council, Youth Council, Adult Council, Professional Council, and other groups.

== General election campaign ==
On December 22, 2017, Grant Wahl of Sports Illustrated reported that outgoing U.S. Soccer President, Sunil Gulati and Major League Soccer commissioner, Don Garber were campaigning for, and hosted a campaign dinner for Kathy Carter. This sparked a potential conflict of interest given Carter's current role with Soccer United Marketing, and SUM's relationship with U.S. Soccer and MLS. Carter denied any collusion between her, Gulati and Garber.

Shortly after, Carter received the endorsement from the Eastern New York State Soccer Association (ENYSSA) and the New Jersey Soccer Association (NJSA). When asked on Twitter about the decision-making process to endorse Carter, the ENYSSA blocked several accounts on Twitter, only to revert the blocks and claiming their account was "hacked".

== Candidates ==
On December 20, 2017, USSF announced that eight candidates were eligible to stand for election, having met the federation's requirements, with only Paul Lapointe failing to qualify for the ballot.

=== Confirmed ===
- Paul Caligiuri, former player of the US national team
- Kathy Carter, former college player and president of Soccer United Marketing
- Carlos Cordeiro, USSF vice president since 2016 and member of CONCACAF Council
- Steve Gans, attorney based in Boston
- Kyle Martino, former player of the US national team, TV analyst
- Hope Solo, former player of the US women's national team, World Cup champion
- Michael Winograd, lawyer and former professional player and general manager in the A-League
- Eric Wynalda, former player of the US national team, analyst for Fox Sports 1/FOX Sports and former head coach

=== Failed to Qualify ===
- Paul Lapointe, Massachusetts regional director of United Premier Soccer League and former commissioner/owner of the American Indoor Soccer League

=== Declined ===
- Rocco Commisso, owner of the New York Cosmos
- Joe Cummings, former head of National Soccer Coaches Association of America, now United Soccer Coaches
- Landon Donovan, former player of the US national team
- Brad Friedel, head coach of the New England Revolution and former head coach of the United States men's national under-19 soccer team
- Julie Foudy, former USWNT captain, former president of Women's Sports Foundation, current journalist for ESPN
- Sunil Gulati, incumbent
- Angela Hucles, member of U.S. Soccer Athletes Council, former president of Women's Sports Foundation
- Mia Hamm, former USWNT player, part-owner of Los Angeles FC
- Claudio Reyna, sporting director of New York City FC
- Nelson Rodriguez, general manager of Chicago Fire
- Rishi Sehgal, interim commissioner of the North American Soccer League
- Charlie Stillitano, director of the International Champions Cup

== Endorsements ==
Eric Wynalda

Leagues

- National Premier Soccer League
- National Independent Soccer Association
- North American Soccer League
- NorCal Premier Soccer

Organizations

- Rush Soccer
- American Soccer United

Soccer Associations

- New Hampshire Soccer Association
- Illinois State Soccer Association

Soccer Clubs

- Monmouth Generals FC
- Galveston Hurricanes FC

Notable Individuals

- Riccardo Silva, president of Miami FC
- Rocco Commisso, owner of the New York Cosmos
- Michael Gross, former secretary of the Illinois State Soccer Association
- Boris Jerkunica, co-owner of the Atlanta Silverbacks
- Paul Lapointe, Massachusetts regional director of the United Premier Soccer League

Soccer Coaching Staff and Management

- Peter Wilt, former general manager of the Chicago Fire
- Andy Smith, general manager of Reno 1868 FC
Kyle Martino

Soccer Players

- Thierry Henry, former soccer player
- David Beckham, former soccer player and founder of the David Beckham Academy
- Mickey Kydes, former soccer player, owner of Mickey Kydes Soccer, and president of the Beachside Soccer Club of Connecticut
- Maheta Molango, former soccer player, lawyer, and CEO of RCD Mallorca
- Dax McCarty, soccer player for the Chicago Fire
- Edson Buddle, former soccer player and CEO of Golden Touch Soccer Academy LA
- Sacha Kljestan, soccer player for Orlando City SC

Organizations

- Street Soccer USA

Notable Individuals

- Matt Popoli, president of the New York Surf Soccer Club
- Jared Young, contributor to Stars and Stripes FC, Analysis Evolved, and The Union Deux

Soccer Associations

- South Carolina Youth Soccer Association
- Connecticut State Soccer Association
Michael Winograd

Organizations

- Ropes & Gray law firm
Steve Gans

Notable Individuals

- John Berylson, chairman of Millwall FC
- Paul F. Levy, former CEO of Beth Israel Deaconess Medical Center
- Gabe Kapler, manager of the Philadelphia Phillies

Soccer Coaching Staff and Management

- Chris Hamblin, head coach of Harvard women's soccer

Soccer Associations

- Rhode Island Soccer Association

Soccer Players

- Paul Keegan, former soccer player
Kathy Carter

Soccer Associations

- Eastern New York State Soccer Association
- New Jersey Soccer Association

Notable Individuals

- Patti Phillips, CEO of Women Leaders in College Sports

Leagues

- National Women's Soccer League

Soccer Players

- Julie Foudy, former soccer player, former president of the Women's Sport Foundation, ESPN journalist
Paul Caligiuri

Leagues

- United Premier Soccer League
Hope Solo

Organizations

- Portuguese Football Players' Union

Notable Individuals

- Michael Skolnik, businessman and filmmaker
- Ronald J. Garan, Jr., former astronaut

Soccer Players

- Aya Miyama, soccer player for Okayama Yunogo Belle, captain of the Japan women's national football team
Carlos Cordeiro

Notable Individuals

- Thomas Navratil, author, columnist, and former official at the U.S. Department of State

== Results ==
First ballot

- Carlos Cordeiro – 36.3%
- Kathy Carter – 34.6%
- Eric Wynalda – 13.7%
- Kyle Martino – 8.6%
- Steve Gans – 4.1%
- Hope Solo – 1.6%
- Michael Winograd – 0.6%
- Paul Caligiuri – 0.5%
  - Paul Caligiuri – withdrew

Second ballot

- Carlos Cordeiro – 41.8%
- Kathy Carter – 33.3%
- Eric Wynalda – 10.8%
- Kyle Martino – 10.2%
- Steve Gans – 2.4%
- Hope Solo – 1.5%
- Michael Winograd – 0.0%
  - Michael Winograd and Steve Gans withdrew

Third ballot

- Carlos Cordeiro – 68.6%
- Kathy Carter – 10.6%
- Kyle Martino – 10.6%
- Eric Wynalda – 8.9%
- Hope Solo – 1.4%
- Carlos Cordeiro elected
