= Eastern New York State Soccer Association =

- Formation: 1913
- Purpose: State Soccer Association
- Location(s): 74 Curtis Lane Yonkers, New York 10710
- President: Vacant
- Vice President: Albino Guimaraes
- Secretary: Orlando Byfield
- Treasurer: Mario Treglia
- Website: http://enyssa.org/

The Eastern New York State Soccer Association (ENYSSA) is the governing body of soccer in the eastern half of New York state, specifically the counties east of the Interstate 81 corridor.

== History ==
ENYSSA was founded in 1913 to serve as an organization to nurture and develop the sport of soccer in eastern New York. The purpose of the organization is encourage the development of the sport and encourage the growth of community leagues, organizations, clubs, programs, and teams in the state. This is so that the sport is accessible to all New Yorkers. ENYSSA's additional purposes are to promote and foster sportsmanship, as well as organize tournaments.

The first formations of the ENYSSA began on March 25, 1886, with the foundation of the New York State Football Association (NYSFA). The NYSFA was organized during a meeting at the Riverside Club Rooms in New York. The organization was founded with the founding of the following six clubs in New York:

- New York Riverside Football Club
- West Side Rovers
- Olympic Athletic Club
- The Pilgrims
- West Brighton
- Continental Clubs

The organization changed its name to the Southern New York Football Association in 1912, and then in 1913 became the current, Eastern New York State Soccer Association.

On December 22, 2017, in the wake of the 2018 United States Soccer Federation presidential election, Grant Wahl of Sports Illustrated reported that outgoing U.S. Soccer President, Sunil Gulati and Major League Soccer commissioner, Don Garber were campaigning for, and hosted a campaign dinner for Kathy Carter with members of ENYSSA. This sparked a potential conflict of interest given Carter's current role with Soccer United Marketing, and SUM's relationship with U.S. Soccer and MLS. Carter denied any collusion between her, Gulati and Garber.

Shortly after, Carter received the endorsement from ENYSSA and the New Jersey Soccer Association (NJSA). When asked on Twitter about the decision-making process to endorse Carter, the ENYSSA blocked several accounts on Twitter, only to revert the blocks and claiming their account was "hacked".

=== Presidents of ENYSSA ===
There have been 10 presidents in the history of ENYSSA. The most recent president was Sal Rapaglia, who was president of ENYSSA from 1990 until his death in 2025. Rapaglia was the previous president from 1979 until 1986.

President	Years
Rudolph Manning	1913–1925
Harry Krauss	1958–1965
Ludolf Heidecker	1965–1967
Archie Gabrielson	1967–1969
Harry Saunders	1969–1972
Saverio Foglia	1972–1974
George Donnelly	1974–1977
Enzo Magrozzi	1977–1979
Sal Rapaglia	1979–1986
Costas Macuos	1986–1990
Sal Rapaglia	1990–2025

== Administration ==
ENYSSA is governed by a board of directors that serve from August to July of the given calendar year. The current administration is as follows:

Individual	Role
Sal Rapaglia	President
Peter Pinori	Secretary General
Albino Guimaraes	First Vice President
Gus Xikis	Second Vice President
Alfonso Vargas	Third Vice President
Peter Strumpf	Fourth Vice President
Orlando Byfield	Recording Secretary
Mario Treglia	Treasurer
Richard Christiano	Youth President

== League structure ==
ENYSSA administers the following leagues that are affiliated with the United States Adult Soccer Association.

- Cosmopolitan Soccer League
- Long Island Soccer Football League
- Eastern District Soccer League
- New York Metropolitan Women's Soccer League
- Central Brooklyn Soccer League
- Central New York State Soccer League
- ALLFUT

== Cups ==
ENYSSA administers the following cup competitions:

- Dr. Manning Cup – for all men's premier division ENYSSA clubs
- Jack Flamhaft Cup – for all men's first and second division ENYSSA clubs
- Livino D'Arpino Cup – for all men's third and reserve division ENYSSA clubs
- Lombardo Cup – for all women's ENYSSA clubs
- Fritz Marth Cup – for all over-30 clubs
- Rocco Amoroso Cup – for all over-40 clubs

== Hall of Fame ==
The ENYSSA administers a Hall of Fame for all individuals and players who have contributed to the sport in Eastern New York.
