= United 2026 FIFA World Cup bid =

Joint bid to host the FIFA World Cup in 2026

2026 FIFA World Cup bid
United 2026 Canada–United States–Mexico 2026

Tournament details
- Host countries: Canada; United States; Mexico
- Venues: 16 (selected from a proposal of 23) (in 16 host cities)

United 2026, also known as the North American 2026 bid, was a successful joint bid led by the United States Soccer Federation, together with the Canadian Soccer Association and the Mexican Football Federation, to host the 2026 FIFA World Cup in Canada, Mexico, and the United States of America.

While the soccer federations of Canada, Mexico, and the United States had individually announced plans to field a bid for the 2026 World Cup, the concept of a joint bid among the three North American countries was first proposed in 2016. The joint bid was unveiled on April 10, 2017, under which the tournament would be held at venues in all three countries. A shortlist of 23 candidate cities were named in the official bid, with 17 in the U.S., 3 in Canada, and 3 in Mexico. The final list included eleven U.S. cities that joined two Canadian cities and three Mexican cities, to form the roster of 16 cities that hosted the matches of the World Cup. Although a joint bid, the majority of the matches were held in the United States. The initial bid recommended that the United States would host 60 of the 80 matches. After the tournament format was modified in March 2023, the match allocation then stood as follows: of the 104 matches, Canada hosted 13 matches, Mexico hosted 13 matches, and the United States hosted 78 matches, including all matches from the quarterfinals onward.

On June 13, 2018, at the 68th FIFA Congress in Moscow, Russia, the United bid was selected by 134 votes to Morocco's 65. Upon this selection, Canada became the fifth country to host both the men's and women's World Cup, joining Sweden, the United States, Germany, and France. Mexico became the first country to host three men's World Cups, and the United States became the first country to host both the men's and women's World Cup twice each. This was the first World Cup to be hosted in three countries, as well as the first since 2002 and the second overall to be held in multiple countries.

== Background ==
The three soccer federations of Canada, Mexico, and the U.S. announced interest in submitting a bid for the 2026 FIFA World Cup years before the federations intended to unify their efforts.

In July 2012, Canadian Soccer Association president Victor Montagliani confirmed plans for a Canadian bid, saying: "We have verbally told FIFA that when the bid process begins for the next available World Cup, which would be the 2026 World Cup, that the CSA will be one of the countries putting in a formal proposal". At the time the bid was announced, Canada had hosted the men's 1987 Under-16 World Championship and the U-20 World Cups for both men and women; the country has since hosted the 2014 FIFA U-20 Women's World Cup and the FIFA Women's World Cup in 2015. In October 2013, Montagliani confirmed Canada's intention to bid for the 2026 tournament and the Canadian Soccer Association reiterated this in January 2014.

In September 2012, Mexican Football Federation (FMF) President Justino Compeán confirmed plans for a Mexican bid. In October 2013, Liga MX President said that Mexico was interested in joining forces with the U.S. to co-host a bid for the 2026 World Cup. On December 9, 2014, FMF confirmed that it was bidding for the 2026 World Cup.

On May 13, 2016, at the FIFA Congress in Mexico City, USSF board member John Motta told ESPN "whatever happens, we will bid for the 2026 World Cup -- either jointly (with Mexico or Canada) or we will do it alone." The United States hosted the 1994 FIFA World Cup and unsuccessfully bid for the 2022 World Cup, which was won by Qatar in 2010. On April 18, 2015, Brazilian legend Pelé stated that the United States should host the 2026 World Cup.

In December 2016, Victor Montagliani, CONCACAF president announced for the first time a possibility of a joint bid between the United States, Canada, and Mexico to host the 2026 World Cup.

On April 10, 2017, the three bodies announced their intent to submit a joint bid for the 2026 World Cup.

== Bid process ==
Bidding for the 2026 FIFA World Cup was postponed due to the 2015 FIFA corruption case and the subsequent resignation of Sepp Blatter, then was restarted following the FIFA Council meeting on May 10, 2016, wherein the bidding process would consist of four phases:

- May 2016 – May 2017: a new strategy and consultation phase
- June 2017 – Dec 2017: enhanced phases for bid preparation
- March 2018 – June 2018: bid evaluation
- June 2018: final decision

With no rival bid having emerged since April 2017 the CONCACAF member federations of Canada, Mexico, and the United States sent a joint request to FIFA to hasten the bid process. Canada, Mexico, and the United States wanted FIFA to award the bid outside the traditional bidding process at the June 2018 FIFA Congress in Moscow if the CONCACAF-bid meets FIFA requirements.

However the FIFA Council decided on May 8, 2017, that FIFA would have a full bidding procedure. In order to ensure continental rotation of hosting duties, only the member associations of CAF, CONCACAF, CONMEBOL, and the OFC were invited, as these continental confederations had not hosted the two previous World Cups. A date of August 11, 2017, was set for submission of an intention to bid.

== FIFA soccer tournament hosting experiences ==
Together, Canada, Mexico, and the United States had hosted 14 FIFA events, which was the most of any trio of geographically connected nations.

- Canada
  - 1987 U-16 World Championship
  - 2002 U-19 Women's World Championship
  - 2007 U-20 World Cup
  - 2014 U-20 Women's World Cup
  - 2015 Women's World Cup
- Mexico
  - 1970 World Cup
  - 1983 World Youth Championship
  - 1986 World Cup
  - 1999 Confederations Cup
  - 2011 U-17 World Cup
- United States
  - 1994 World Cup
  - 1999 Women's World Cup
  - 2003 Women's World Cup
  - 2025 Club World Cup

In addition, all three countries had hosted at least one Olympic soccer tournament: Canada played host in Montreal 1976, Mexico in Mexico City 1968, and the United States hosted thrice – in St. Louis 1904, Los Angeles 1984 and Atlanta 1996. The Atlanta Games were the first to include a women's tournament.

== Bid committee ==
On July 6, 2017, a United Bid Committee was officially formed by the national federations of Canada, Mexico, and the United States, to kick off the bidding process to bring the 2026 World Cup to North America.

Honorary chairman of the board

- Robert Kraft: National Football League and Major League Soccer executive and owner

United bid committee board of directors

- Steven Reed – co-chairman, president of the Canadian Soccer Association
- Decio de María – co-chairman, president of the Mexican Football Federation
- Carlos Cordeiro – co-chairman, president of the United States Soccer Federation
- Victor Montagliani – president of CONCACAF
- Sunil Gulati – FIFA Council member
- Don Garber – commissioner of Major League Soccer
- Dan Flynn – secretary general of U.S. Soccer
- Donna Shalala – trustee professor of Political Science at the University of Miami
- Guillermo Cantu – general secretary of the Mexican Football Federation
- Peter Montopoli – general secretary of the Canadian Soccer Association
- Carlos Bocanegra – technical director of Atlanta United FC
- Julie Foudy – founder of Julie Foudy Sports Leadership Academy and television analyst and reporter for ESPN/ABC
- Ed Foster-Simeon – president and CEO of U.S. Soccer Foundation

United bid committee executive team

- John Kristick – executive director for the united bid committee
- Jim Brown – managing director, technical operations
- Peter Montopoli – Canada bid director
- Yon De Luisa – Mexico bid director

== Potential venues ==
On August 15, 2017, the United Bid Committee released a list of 49 existing, fully-functional stadiums in 44 metropolitan markets across the three nations to be considered for the official bid. Cities had to submit written proposals to the United Bid Committee by January 19, 2018, before being selected by the committee. The United Bid Committee planned to include 20–25 venues in the official bid, which was sent to FIFA in March 2018. Stadiums had to have a capacity of at least 40,000 for group stage matches and at least 80,000 for the opening match and the final.

On September 7, 2017, the United Bid Committee announced that a total of 41 cities (with 44 venues) had submitted bids marking their official declaration of interest to be included in the final bid. Almost a month later, on October 4, 2017, the list of cities was cut down to 32 with 35 venues. During U.S. Soccer's annual general meeting in Orlando in February 2018, Gulati revealed that the list of cities had been cut down to 26 with 26 venues.

On March 14, 2018, Soldier Field in Chicago, U.S. Bank Stadium in Minneapolis, and BC Place in Vancouver all announced that they were dropping out as potential host cities. All three cities cited concerns over the financial transparency of being a host city and cited FIFA's unwillingness to negotiate financial details as reasons for their decisions; the bid committee announced the next day they had reduced the number of cities in the bid to 23.

On July 6, 2021, Canada Soccer announced that Montreal had withdrawn its bid from the selection process, due to the Quebec provincial government withdrawing its support. On April 14, 2022, more than four years after dropping out, BC Place in Vancouver was announced as a replacement for Montreal. On April 21, 2022, Washington, D.C. announced that they were dropping out and merging their campaign with Baltimore's M&T Bank Stadium.

The official bid proposed the main opening match to be held in either Azteca Stadium in Mexico City or at the Rose Bowl in the Los Angeles area, that all three host countries' teams host their first matches on the first day of the tournament and that the final match be held at MetLife Stadium in the New York City area. The bid also proposed the two semifinal matches to be held at AT&T Stadium in the Dallas/Fort Worth area and Mercedes-Benz Stadium in Atlanta. All of the other cities in the American portion of the bid were considered for quarterfinal matches. The bid book proposal called for Mexico and Canada to each host seven group stage matches, two matches in the round of 32, and one in the round of 16.

A † denotes stadium used for previous men's World Cup tournaments
A ‡ denotes retractable-roof or indoor stadium

=== Venues excluded since start of bidding process ===
==== Venues that were contacted but did not submit a bid ====
City	Stadium	Capacity	Image
(Canada) Calgary, Alberta	McMahon Stadium	35,400 (expandable to 46,020)	
(United States) Green Bay, Wisconsin	Lambeau Field	81,441	
(Canada) Montreal, Quebec	Saputo Stadium	20,801	
(United States) San Diego, California	Qualcomm Stadium	70,561	
(Canada) Toronto, Ontario	Rogers Centre‡	54,000	

==== Venues that submitted bids but were rejected (1st round) ====
City	Stadium	Capacity	Image
(United States) Birmingham, Alabama	Legion Field	71,594	
(United States) Cleveland, Ohio	Huntington Bank Field	67,895	
(United States) Indianapolis, Indiana	Lucas Oil Stadium‡	62,421 (expandable to 70,000)	
(United States) Jacksonville, Florida	TIAA Bank Field	69,132 (expandable to 82,000)	
(United States) New Orleans, Louisiana	Caesars Superdome‡	73,208 (expandable to 76,438)	
(Canada) Ottawa, Ontario	TD Place Stadium	24,000	
(United States) Pittsburgh, Pennsylvania	Acrisure Stadium	69,690	
(Canada) Regina, Saskatchewan	Mosaic Stadium	33,350 (expandable to 40,000)	
(United States) San Antonio, Texas	Alamodome‡	64,000	

==== Venues that submitted bids but were rejected (2nd round) ====
During the 2018 U.S. Soccer Annual General Meeting, Sunil Gulati announced that the following cities were not selected for the final hosting bid.

City	Stadium	Capacity	Image
(United States) Charlotte, North Carolina	Bank of America Stadium	75,525	
(United States) Dallas, Texas	Cotton Bowl†	92,100	
(United States) Detroit, Michigan	Ford Field‡	65,000 (expandable to 70,000)	
(United States) Las Vegas, Nevada	Allegiant Stadium‡ (Paradise, Nevada)	72,000	
(United States) Los Angeles, California	Memorial Coliseum	93,607	
(United States) Phoenix, Arizona	State Farm Stadium‡ (Glendale, Arizona)	63,400 (expandable to 78,600)	
(United States) Salt Lake City, Utah	Rice–Eccles Stadium	53,609	
(United States) Tampa, Florida	Raymond James Stadium	65,890 (expandable to 75,000)	

==== Venues that withdrew voluntarily ====
City	Stadium	Capacity	Image
(United States) Chicago, Illinois	Soldier Field†	61,500	
(United States) Minneapolis, Minnesota	U.S. Bank Stadium‡	66,655 (expandable to 73,000)	
(Canada) Montreal, Quebec	Olympic Stadium‡	61,004 (Bid book: 55,822) (Expandable to 73,000)	
(United States) Washington, D.C.	Northwest Stadium (Landover, Maryland)	62,000	

==== Venues excluded from final list (June 2022) ====
City	Stadium	Capacity	Image
(United States) Baltimore, Maryland	M&T Bank Stadium	71,006 (Bid book: 70,976)	
(United States) Cincinnati, Ohio	Paycor Stadium	65,515 (Bid book: 67,402)	
(United States) Denver, Colorado	Empower Field at Mile High	76,125 (Bid book: 77,595)	
(Canada) Edmonton, Alberta	Commonwealth Stadium	56,302 (Bid book: 56,418)	
(United States) Los Angeles, California	Rose Bowl (Pasadena, California)†	92,000 (Bid book: 88,432)	
(United States) Nashville, Tennessee	Nissan Stadium	69,143 (Bid book: 69,722) (expandable to 75,000)	
(United States) Orlando, Florida	Camping World Stadium†	60,219 (Bid book: 65,000)	

Rejected and uninterested venues:
: Venue declined to participate
: Venue withdrew voluntarily
: Venue submitted bid but was rejected (1st round)
: Venue submitted bid but was rejected (2nd round)
: Venue cut after final decision (June 2022)

=== Venues selected to host matches ===
==== Canada ====
City	Stadium	Capacity	Image
Vancouver, British Columbia	BC Place‡	54,000	
Toronto, Ontario	BMO Field	30,000 (Expanding to 45,500 for tournament)	
Canadian cities hosting matches

==== Mexico ====
City	Stadium	Capacity	Image
Mexico City	Estadio Azteca†	87,523	
Monterrey, Nuevo León	Estadio BBVA (Guadalupe, Nuevo León)	53,500 (Bid book: 53,460)	
Guadalajara, Jalisco	Estadio Akron (Zapopan, Jalisco)	46,232 (Bid book: 48,071)	
Mexican cities hosting matches

==== United States ====
City	Stadium	Capacity	Image
New York/New Jersey	MetLife Stadium (East Rutherford, New Jersey)	82,500 (Bid book: 87,157)	
Dallas, Texas	AT&T Stadium‡ (Arlington, Texas)	80,000 (Bid book: 92,967) (expandable to 105,000)	
Kansas City, Missouri	Arrowhead Stadium	76,416 (Bid book: 76,640)	
Houston, Texas	NRG Stadium‡	72,220	
Atlanta, Georgia	Mercedes-Benz Stadium‡	71,000 (Bid book: 75,000) (expandable to 83,000)	
Los Angeles, California*	SoFi Stadium (Inglewood, California)	70,240 (expandable to 100,240)	
Philadelphia, Pennsylvania	Lincoln Financial Field	69,796 (Bid book: 69,328)	
Seattle, Washington	Lumen Field	69,000 (expandable to 72,000)	
San Francisco Bay Area	Levi's Stadium (Santa Clara, California)	68,500 (Bid book: 70,909) (expandable to 75,000)	
Boston, Massachusetts	Gillette Stadium (Foxborough, Massachusetts)	65,878 (Bid book: 70,000)	
Miami, Florida	Hard Rock Stadium (Miami Gardens, Florida)	64,767 (Bid book: 67,518)	
* = Was not initially included in the bid book but was eventually considered.
American cities hosting matches

=== Additional host venue information ===
==== Canada ====
City	Venue	Year opened	Tenants	Major sporting events hosted
Toronto	BMO Field	2007 (Expanded 2015)	Toronto FC (MLS) (2007–present); Toronto Nationals (MLL) (2009); Toronto Argonauts (CFL) (2016–present); Toronto FC II (USL1) (2018)	2007 FIFA U-20 World Cup venue 2014 FIFA U-20 Women's World Cup venue 2015 CONCACAF Gold Cup venue 2015 Pan American Games Rugby Sevens venue 104th Grey Cup venue MLS Cup 2010 venue MLS Cup 2016 venue MLS Cup 2017 venue 2018 CONCACAF Champions League Finals first leg venue
Vancouver	BC Place	1983 (Renovated 2009, 2011)	BC Lions (CFL) (1983–present); Vancouver Whitecaps FC (MLS) (2011–present); Vancouver Whitecaps (NASL) (1983–1984); Vancouver Nighthawks (WBL) (1988)	9-time Grey Cup venue 1990 Gay Games; 2010 Winter Olympics host stadium 2015 FIFA Women's World Cup venue and final venue Annual Canada Sevens venue

==== Mexico ====
City	Venue	Year opened	Tenants	Major sporting events hosted
Guadalajara (Zapopan)	Estadio Akron	2010	Guadalajara (2010–present)	2010 Copa Libertadores Finals venue 2011 FIFA U-17 World Cup venue 2011 Pan American Games host stadium
Mexico City	Estadio Azteca	1966 (Renovated 1986, 1999, 2013 and 2016)	Mexico national football team (1966–present); América (1966–present); Necaxa (1966–1970, 1982–2003); Atlante (1966–1982, 1996–2001, 2004–2007); UNAM (1967–1969); Atlético Español (1970–1982); Cruz Azul (1971–1996, 2018–present)	1970 FIFA World Cup venue and final venue (Capacity: 108,000); 1986 FIFA World Cup venue and final venue (Capacity: 114,600); 1968 Summer Olympics soccer venue 1975 Pan American Games venue 1983 FIFA World Youth Championship venue 1985 Mexico City Cup / Azteca 2000 venue 1993 CONCACAF Gold Cup venue 1999 FIFA Confederations Cup venue 2003 CONCACAF Gold Cup venue 2011 FIFA U-17 World Cup venue
Monterrey (Guadalupe)	Estadio BBVA Bancomer	2015	Monterrey (2015–present)	

==== United States ====
City	Venue	Year opened	Tenants	Major sporting events hosted
Atlanta	Mercedes-Benz Stadium	2017	Atlanta Falcons (NFL) (2017–present); Atlanta United FC (MLS) (2017–present); Peach Bowl (NCAA) (2017–present); Celebration Bowl (NCAA) (2017–present); SEC Championship Game (NCAA) (2017–present)	2018 College Football Playoff National Championship; Super Bowl LIII; 2025 College Football Playoff National Championship
Boston (Foxborough)	Gillette Stadium	2002	New England Patriots (NFL) (2002–present); New England Revolution (MLS) (2002–present); Massachusetts Minutemen (NCAA) (2012–2016); Boston Cannons (MLL) (2015)	2003 FIFA Women's World Cup venue 2003 CONCACAF Gold Cup venue 2005 CONCACAF Gold Cup venue 2007 CONCACAF Gold Cup venue 2009 CONCACAF Gold Cup venue 2015 CONCACAF Gold Cup venue Copa América Centenario venue
Dallas/Fort Worth (Arlington)	AT&T Stadium	2009	Dallas Cowboys (NFL) (2009–present); Cotton Bowl Classic (NCAA) (2010–present); Big 12 Championship Game (NCAA) (2009–2010, 2017–present)	2009 CONCACAF Gold Cup venue 2011 CONCACAF Gold Cup venue 2013 CONCACAF Gold Cup venue 2011 World Football Challenge venue Super Bowl XLV; 2014 NCAA Basketball Final Four; 2015 College Football Playoff National Championship (NCAA)
Houston	NRG Stadium	2002	Houston Texans (NFL) (2002–present); Houston Livestock Show and Rodeo (2003–present); Texas Bowl (NCAA) (2006–present); Houston Cougars (NCAA) (2013)	2005 CONCACAF Gold Cup venue 2007 CONCACAF Gold Cup venue 2009 CONCACAF Gold Cup venue 2011 CONCACAF Gold Cup venue Copa América Centenario venue 2010 MLS All-Star Game; Super Bowl XXXVIII Super Bowl LI (NFL); 2024 College Football Playoff National Championship (NCAA)
Kansas City	Arrowhead Stadium	1972 (Renovated 2007–2010)	Kansas City Chiefs (NFL) (1972–present); Kansas City Wizards (MLS) (1996–2007)	2000, 2003, 2004, 2006, and 2008 Big 12 Championship Games; Various international friendly matches and a 2001 World Cup qualifying match
Los Angeles (Inglewood)	SoFi Stadium	2020	Los Angeles Rams (NFL) (2020–present); Los Angeles Chargers (NFL) (2020–present); LA Bowl (NCAA) (2021–2025)	Super Bowl LVI (NFL); 2023 College Football Playoff National Championship (NCAA); Super Bowl LXI (NFL); 2028 Summer Olympics and 2028 Summer Paralympics venue
Miami (Miami Gardens)	Hard Rock Stadium	1987 (Renovated 2016)	Miami Dolphins (NFL) (1987–present); Russell Athletic Bowl (NCAA) (1990–2000); Florida Marlins (MLB) (1993–2011); Orange Bowl (NCAA) (1996–present); Florida Atlantic Owls (NCAA) (2001–2002); Miami Hurricanes (NCAA) (2008–present); Miami Open (tennis) (2019–present); Miami Grand Prix (F1) (2022–present)	2014 International Champions Cup venue 2017 International Champions Cup (incl. El Clasico Miami 2017); Various friendly matches between CONCACAF and CONMEBOL teams Super Bowls XXIII, XXIX, XXXIII, XLI, XLIV and LIV (NFL); 2009 BCS National Championship Game (NCAA); 2013 BCS National Championship Game; 1997 World Series games 2003 World Series games (MLB); 2013 CONCACAF Gold Cup venue 2021 and 2026 College Football Playoff National Championship (NCAA)
New York City (East Rutherford)	MetLife Stadium	2010	New York Giants (NFL) (2010–present); New York Jets (NFL) (2010–present); New York Guardians (XFL) (2020)	Copa América Centenario venue and final match venue 2016 International Champions Cup venue 2017 International Champions Cup venue 2011 CONCACAF Gold Cup venue 2015 CONCACAF Gold Cup venue Super Bowl XLVIII
Philadelphia	Lincoln Financial Field	2003 (Renovated and expanded 2013–2014)	Philadelphia Eagles (NFL) (2003–present); Temple Owls (NCAA) (2003–present); Philadelphia Union (MLS) (2010)	2003 FIFA Women's World Cup venue 2009 CONCACAF Gold Cup venue 2015 CONCACAF Gold Cup final match venue Copa América Centenario venue
San Francisco Bay Area (San Jose/Santa Clara)	Levi's Stadium	2014	San Francisco 49ers (NFL) (2014–present); San Francisco Bowl (NCAA) (2014–2019); Pac-12 Football Championship Game (NCAA) (2014–2019)	2015 International Champions Cup venue Copa América Centenario venue 2017 CONCACAF Gold Cup final match venue Super Bowl 50 (NFL); 2019 College Football Playoff National Championship (NCAA)
Seattle	Lumen Field	2002	Seattle Seahawks (NFL) (2002–present); Seattle Sounders (USL 1) (2003–2007); Seattle Sounders FC (MLS) (2009–present); Washington Huskies (NCAA) (2011–2012); Seattle Reign FC (NWSL) (2022–present); Seattle (Sea) Dragons (XFL) (2020-2023)	2005 CONCACAF Gold Cup venue 2009 CONCACAF Gold Cup venue 2013 CONCACAF Gold Cup venue Copa América Centenario venue MLS Cup 2009 venue MLS Cup 2019 venue

== General facilities ==
Team base camps
Facility	Location
Nottawasaga Hotel and Resort	Alliston, Ontario
United States Naval Academy	Annapolis, Maryland
Loyola University Maryland	Baltimore, Maryland
Pingry School	Basking Ridge, New Jersey
Cedar Lane Regional Park	Bel Air, Maryland
National Sports Center	Blaine, Minnesota
Maryland SoccerPlex	Boyds, Maryland
SeatGeek Stadium	Bridgeview, Illinois
SeatGeek Stadium Practice Fields	Bridgeview, Illinois
Swangard Stadium	Burnaby, British Columbia
Tom Binnie Park	Surrey, British Columbia
Dignity Health Sports Park	Carson, California
CIBC Fire Pitch	Chicago, Illinois
University of Illinois Chicago	Chicago, Illinois
TQL Stadium	Cincinnati, Ohio
University of Cincinnati	Cincinnati, Ohio
Texas A&M University	College Station, Texas
Cotton Bowl Stadium	Dallas, Texas
H-E-B Park	Edinburg, Texas
Ivor Dent Sports Park	Edmonton, Alberta
Edmonton Scottish United Soccer Club	Edmonton, Alberta
Toyota Stadium	Frisco, Texas
Zions Bank Real Academy	Herriman, Utah
National Training and Coaching Development Center	Kansas City, Kansas
D.C. United Training Site	Leesburg, Virginia
Inter Miami CF Training Site	Fort Lauderdale, Florida
Tropical Park Stadium	Miami, Florida
FC Cincinnati Training Ground	Milford, Ohio
California State University Monterey Bay	Monterey County, California
Estadio Universitario	Monterrey, Nuevo León
Centro de Entrenamiento BBVA Bancomer	Monterrey, Nuevo León
Morgan Hill Outdoor Sports Center	Morgan Hill, California
Calvert Regional Sports Park	North East, Maryland
Oak Brook Park District Central Park	Oak Brook, Illinois
McDonogh School	Owings Mills, Maryland
Saint Louis University	St. Louis, Missouri
Allianz Field	St. Paul, Minnesota
San Francisco State University	San Francisco, California
Stevenson University	Stevenson, Maryland
Starfire Sports Complex	Tukwila, Washington
Kean University	Union, New Jersey
University of Victoria	Victoria, British Columbia
Royal Athletic Park	Victoria, British Columbia
American University	Washington, D.C.
Babson College	Wellesley, Massachusetts
Club Deportivo UDG	Zapopan, Jalisco
Tec de Monterrey Campus Guadalajara	Zapopan, Jalisco
Club Atlas Chapalita	Zapopan, Jalisco
Universidad Panaméricana	Zapopan, Jalisco
Chivas Verde Valle	Zapopan, Jalisco

Venue-specific training team facilities
Facility	Location
Atlanta
Atlanta United Training Center (2)	Atlanta, Georgia
Pace Academy Riverview Sports Complex	Atlanta, Georgia
Georgia State University (2)	Atlanta, Georgia
Baltimore
University of Maryland, Baltimore County	Catonsville, Maryland
Goucher College	Baltimore, Maryland
Towson University	Towson, Maryland
The Bob Lucido Fields at Covenant Park	Ellicott City, Maryland
Boston
Wellesley College	Wellesley, Massachusetts
Nobles and Greenough School	Dedham, Massachusetts
New England Revolution Training Field	Foxborough, Massachusetts
Harvard University	Boston, Massachusetts
Cincinnati
University of Cincinnati	Cincinnati, Ohio
Northern Kentucky University	Highland Heights, Kentucky
FC Cincinnati Training Ground	Milford, Ohio
Mount St. Joseph University	Delhi Township, Ohio
Dallas
Southern Methodist University	University Park, Texas
Toyota Stadium (2)	Frisco, Texas
MoneyGram Soccer Park (2)	Dallas, Texas
Denver
Dick's Sporting Goods Park (3)	Commerce City, Colorado
University of Denver	Denver, Colorado
Edmonton
University of Alberta	Edmonton, Alberta
Henry Singer Park	Edmonton, Alberta
Victoria Soccer Club	Edmonton, Alberta
Coronation Park	Edmonton, Alberta
Guadalajara
Club Atlas Colomos	Zapopan, Jalisco
Club TECOS AC	Guadalajara, Jalisco
Club Chivas San Rafael	Guadalajara, Jalisco
ITESO	Tlaquepaque, Jalisco
Houston
City of Houston Design Build Training Site	Houston, Texas
Houston Sports Park	Houston, Texas
Harris County Design Build Training Site	Houston, Texas
PNC Stadium	Houston, Texas
Kansas City, MO
Swope Soccer Village	Kansas City, Missouri
Kansas City Chiefs Practice Facility	Kansas City, Missouri
Children's Mercy Park	Kansas City, Kansas
Park University	Parkville, Missouri
Los Angeles
Banc of California Stadium	Los Angeles, California
Dignity Health Sports Park (2)	Carson, California
Los Angeles Memorial Coliseum	Los Angeles, California
Mexico City
Pumas La Cantera	Mexico City
Centro de Alto Rendimiento	Tlalpan, Mexico City
La Nueva Casa del Fútbol	Mexico City
Club América	Mexico City
Miami
Barry University	Miami Shores, Florida
Florida International University	Miami, Florida
St. Thomas University	Miami Gardens, Florida
Inter Miami CF Training Site	Fort Lauderdale, Florida
Monterrey
ITESM	Monterrey, Nuevo León
San Roberto International School Campus San Agustin	Monterrey, Nuevo León
Universidad de Monterrey	San Pedro Garza García, Nuevo León
Irish Institute of Monterrey	San Pedro Garza García, Nuevo León
Montréal
Complexe sportif Marie-Victorin	Montreal, Quebec
Complexe sportif Claude-Robillard	Montreal, Quebec
Stade de Soccer de Montréal	Montreal, Quebec
Centre Nutrilait	Montreal, Quebec
Nashville
Trevecca Nazarene University	Nashville, Tennessee
Geodis Park	Nashville, Tennessee
Lipscomb University	Nashville, Tennessee
Future Nashville SC Training Facilities	Nashville, Tennessee
New York City
Red Bull Arena	Harrison, New Jersey
New York City FC stadium	Bronx, New York
Red Bull Training Center	Whippany, New Jersey
Pingry School	Basking Ridge, New Jersey
Orlando
Lake Sylvan Training Site	Sanford, Florida
University of Central Florida	Orlando, Florida
Exploria Stadium	Orlando, Florida
Lake Nona Training Site	Orlando, Florida
Philadelphia
NovaCare Complex	Philadelphia, Pennsylvania
University of Pennsylvania	Philadelphia, Pennsylvania
Subaru Park	Chester, Pennsylvania
Drexel University	Philadelphia, Pennsylvania
San Francisco Bay Area
Spartan Soccer Complex (2)	San Jose, California
PayPal Park	San Jose, California
Stanford University	Stanford, California
Seattle
Starfire Sports Complex	Tukwila, Washington
Magnuson Park	Seattle, Washington
University of Washington	Seattle, Washington
Genesee Playfields	Seattle, Washington
Toronto
Allan Lamport Stadium	Toronto, Ontario
Cherry Beach Fields	Toronto, Ontario
BMO Training Ground	Toronto, Ontario
Sunnybrook Park Fields	Toronto, Ontario
Washington, D.C.
Trinity Washington University	Washington, D.C.
Maryland SoccerPlex	Boyds, Maryland
Audi Field	Washington, D.C.
RFK Stadium	Washington, D.C.

== Support ==
=== Football confederations ===
- Oceania Football Confederation
- CONCACAF
- CONMEBOL

=== FIFA members ===
- Afghanistan
- Argentina
- Bolivia
- Brazil
- Chile
- Colombia
- Costa Rica
- Denmark
- Ecuador
- El Salvador
- Finland
- Germany
- Grenada
- Guyana
- Honduras
- Iraq
- Jamaica
- Liberia
- Namibia
- Nicaragua
- Panama
- Paraguay
- Peru
- Saudi Arabia
- Uruguay
- Venezuela
- Zimbabwe

=== Public opinion ===
On October 24, 2017, a survey of adults in Canada, Mexico, and the United States showed a broad support for Canada–United States–Mexico bid to host the 2026 FIFA World Cup. It found that 77% of North American residents were in favor of hosting the first-ever 48-team FIFA World Cup, and 81% of respondents across the three countries agreed that hosting the tournament would be good for their specific country. Also, nearly six in 10 (57 percent) of those surveyed said they would be interested in attending FIFA World Cup matches if the games were played near where they live or work.

=== U.S. House of Representatives ===
On April 20, 2018, Representatives Darin LaHood and fellow co-chairs of the Congressional Soccer Caucus Kathy Castor (FL-14), Don Bacon (NE-02), Ruben Kihuen (NV-04) introduced a resolution to recognize and support the efforts of the United Bid Committee to host the 2026 FIFA World Cup in Canada, Mexico and the United States. The U.S. House of Representatives adopted this resolution on April 25, 2018.

=== Other government officials ===
Toronto city councilors Mark Grimes and Cesar Palacio supported the bid, as well as Mayor John Tory. Montreal Mayor Valérie Plante also supported it.

On March 13, 2018, Canadian Minister of Sport Kirsty Duncan announced in Ottawa that the Canadian federal government officially threw its support behind the North American bid for the 2026 World Cup, with the promise of up to $5 million in immediate help should the unified bid win.

U.S. President Donald Trump, Canadian Prime Minister Justin Trudeau, and Mexican President Enrique Peña Nieto all supported the bid for the World Cup. Trump designated Jared Kushner, at the time head of the Office of American Innovation and senior advisor to the president, as point man for the White House.

== Marketing ==
The bid was branded "United 2026", the logo of the bid is a ball with the number 26 representing the year "2026" with the colors of the flags of Canada, Mexico, and the United States and the slogans were: "United As One" (Spanish: "Unidos Como Uno", French: "Unis Comme Un"). and "Football For All" (Spanish: "Fútbol Para Todos", French: "Football Pour Tous").

== Opinions ==
On December 28, 2017, during a sports business conference in Dubai, United Arab Emirates, FIFA president Gianni Infantino considered the United bid to be a positive message.

== Controversies ==
U.S. President Donald Trump's executive orders regarding immigration from certain Muslim-majority countries implemented during his first term in 2017 was touted as a potential risk, with Infantino saying, "Any team, including the supporters and officials of that team, who qualify for a World Cup need to have access to the country, otherwise there is no World Cup." In response, the Trump administration sent letters to FIFA that read, in part, that Trump was "confident" that "all eligible athletes, officials and fans from all countries around the world would be able to enter the United States without discrimination." In 2018, Trump then warned the countries that intended to support the Morocco bid to host the 2026 World Cup, tweeting: "The US has put together a STRONG bid w/ Canada & Mexico for the 2026 World Cup. It would be a shame if countries that we always support were to lobby against the U.S. bid. Why should we be supporting these countries when they don't support us (including at the United Nations)?" In January 2021, the travel ban was reversed by his successor Joe Biden.

Both Trump administrations were met with a wave of concern from co-hosts Canada and Mexico, particularly about his messaging regarding tariffs on both countries as well as the sovereignty of Canada. In addition, restrictions on immigration and a reduced federal workforce created concerns that fans may not be able to get their visas in time for the event, as the wait for a visa interview in some countries was roughly around a year on average, with one travel report from the U.S. Travel Association claiming the U.S. was not even prepared to host one. In June 2025, the second Trump administration reinstated a travel ban affecting citizens from multiple countries, citing national security concerns. The ban, which was later expanded in December, prohibited the issuance of new immigrant and non-immigrant visas for citizens of 39 affected countries, including those of teams that qualified for the World Cup: Haiti, Iran, Ivory Coast, and Senegal. The proclamation included an exemption for any athlete or member of an athletic team, including coaches, persons performing a necessary support role, and immediate relatives, traveling for the World Cup, Olympics, or other major sporting events as determined by the Secretary of State.

This exemption ensured that national teams' players, coaches, and staff from those designated countries would be permitted to enter the United States for the competition, but the US State Department confirmed that ordinary citizens of the four countries were not covered by this exemption, making them ineligible for visa issuance to attend the matches. While fans were permitted to submit visa applications with the promise of priority if they provided proof of tickets, the department noted that issuance would be unlikely, barring rare "national interest" waivers. However, this restriction could be circumvented if a fan was a valid visa holder, a permanent resident, or a dual national who applied using a passport not subject to the ban. In such cases, applicants could still be eligible to enter or apply for entry, provided they satisfied all other immigration and security requirements.
