= Kathy Carter =

American soccer player and sports executive

Former President of Soccer United Marketing
- In office December 13, 2010 – April 13, 2018

Executive Vice President of Soccer United Marketing
- In office 2003 – December 12, 2010

Personal details
- Born: 1969 (age 56–57)
- Education: College of William & Mary
Association football career
- Position: Goalkeeper
College career
Years	Team	Apps	(Gls)
1987–1990	William & Mary	72	(0)
Total		72	(0)

Kathy Carter is an American sports executive and former soccer player who is the former chief executive officer of Soccer United Marketing. Carter was considered a possible candidate for president of the United States Soccer Federation before Carlos Cordeiro won the job in the USSF Presidential Election, which took place on February 10, 2018.

== Soccer career ==
From 1987 to 1990, Carter played college soccer for the William & Mary women's soccer program. She is tied for the lowest goals-against average in program history (0.87). After college she played amateur soccer in adult leagues across the U.S.

== Professional career ==
Her professional career in soccer began in 1993, when she worked for the World Cup Organizing Committee for the 1994 FIFA World Cup. She began working for Major League Soccer as a founding member, and in 1996 became the vice president of corporate marketing for MLS from 1996 until 1999. In 2003, Carter joined Soccer United Marketing, the marketing branch for U.S. Soccer and MLS.

On December 13, 2010, Carter was promoted from executive vice president to president of Soccer United Marketing.

On December 5, 2017, Carter declared her candidacy for president of the United States Soccer Federation. Immediately following her announcement, people speculated that she was handpicked by outgoing president, Sunil Gulati, and MLS Commissioner, Don Garber, primarily because reports came that Gulati was considering her to run before he announced that he would not run. She denied any collusion.

In the 2018 U.S. Soccer presidential election, Carter finished tied with Kyle Martino for second in the results, but lost to Carlos Cordeiro.

In April 2018, Carter left Soccer United Marketing to pursue other opportunities, and on October 15, 2018, Carter was named as the Chief Revenue Officer of LA 2028 and the CEO of US Olympic and Paralympic Properties—the commercial joint venture between LA 2028 and the United States Olympic & Paralympic Committee.

In September 2021, Carter was promoted to the role of chief executive officer for LA 2028, stepping down from the role in December 2023. Carter was succeeded by Reynold Hoover.
