= United States 2022 FIFA World Cup bid =

Football tournament hosting bid

United States 2022 FIFA World Cup bid logo

The United States Soccer Federation submitted a bid with the hope of hosting the 2022 FIFA World Cup. U.S. Soccer first said in February 2007 that it would put forth a bid for the 2018 World Cup. On January 28, 2009, U.S. Soccer announced that it would submit bids for both the 2018 and 2022 Cups. In October 2010 it withdrew from the 2018 bid process to focus on winning the 2022 edition. On December 2, 2010, it was announced that Qatar would be the host of the 2022 FIFA World Cup.

David Downs, president of Univision Sports, was executive director of the bid. The United States previously hosted the FIFA World Cup in 1994, as well as the FIFA Women's World Cup in 1999 and 2003.

== Schedule ==
Date	Notes
January 15, 2009	Applications formally invited
February 2, 2009	Closing date for registering intention to bid
March 16, 2009	Deadline to submit completed bid registration forms
May 14, 2010	Deadline for submission of full details of bid
September 6–9, 2010	Inspection committee visits the United States
December 2, 2010	FIFA to appoint hosts for 2018 and 2022 World Cups

== Bid committee ==
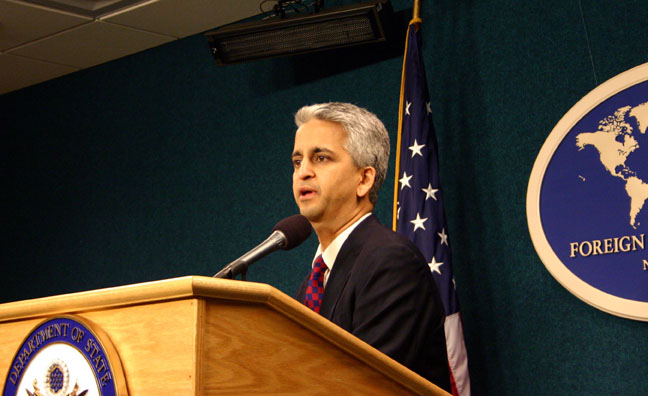
U.S. Soccer President Sunil Gulati was the Bid Committee Chairman.

The American bid was being organized by USA Bid Committee, Inc.

The executive director of the bid was David Downs, CEO of Univision sports. Other members include U.S. Soccer President Sunil Gulati, Major League Soccer Commissioner Don Garber, Phil Murphy, the former national finance chair for the Democratic National Committee, former U.S. Secretary of State Dr. Henry Kissinger, New York City mayor Michael Bloomberg, California Governor Arnold Schwarzenegger, Clinton adviser Douglas Band, film director Spike Lee, former boxer Oscar De La Hoya, and Washington Post. Former U.S. president Bill Clinton served as the honorary chairman of the bid.

== Details of the bid ==
United States 2022 FIFA World Cup bid (the United States)

In April 2009, the U.S. identified 70 existing, fully built stadiums in 50 communities as possible venues for the tournament, with 58 confirming their interest. The list of stadiums was trimmed two months later to 38 existing venues, one scheduled for completion in 2010, and one proposed venue. On August 20, 2009, the list was further trimmed down to 32 stadiums in 27 cities. On January 12, 2010, the USA Bid Committee narrowed the 27 cities down to 18 as the official host cities for the United States' Bid for the 2018 or 2022 World Cup.

Those 18 cities were: Atlanta, Baltimore, Boston, Dallas, Denver, Houston, Indianapolis, Kansas City, Los Angeles, Miami, Nashville, New York City, Philadelphia, Phoenix, San Diego, Seattle, Tampa and Washington, D.C. The 18 stadiums selected primarily host NFL or NCAA American football games, with a capacity over 65,000 spectators, although they are also designed to host soccer. No soccer-specific stadium was selected, since their capacity does not exceed 30,000 spectators.

=== Candidate venues ===
Image	Stadium	Capacity	City	State	Surface	Home teams	Notes
	Rose Bowl	94,542	Pasadena (Host City: Los Angeles)	California	Grass	UCLA Bruins†; Rose Bowl Game	1994 World Cup final venue 1999 Women's World Cup final venue CONCACAF Gold Cup venue Super Bowl XI, Super Bowl XIV, Super Bowl XVII, Super Bowl XXI, and Super Bowl XXVII Hosts; Three BCS National Championship Games; May be superseded by SoFi Stadium
	Los Angeles Memorial Coliseum	93,607	Los Angeles	California	Grass	USC Trojans†	1932 and 1984 Olympic stadium CONCACAF Gold Cup venue Super Bowl I and Super Bowl VII host 1959 World Series; May be superseded by SoFi Stadium
	AT&T Stadium *	91,600	Arlington (Host City: Dallas)	Texas	Matrix artificial turf	Cowboys Classic; Dallas Cowboys†; Cotton Bowl Classic; Southwest Classic	Opened in 2009; Retractable roof CONCACAF Gold Cup venue 2010 NBA All-Star Game venue Super Bowl XLV in 2011 Wrestlemania 32 in 2016
	FedExField	91,704	Landover (Host City: Washington, D.C.)	Maryland	Grass	Washington Redskins†	1999 Women's World Cup venue
	MetLife Stadium *	82,566	East Rutherford (Host City: New York City)	New Jersey	FieldTurf	New York Giants† New York Jets†	Opened in 2010; Hosted Super Bowl XLVIII; Wrestlemania XXIX
	Sun Life Stadium *	80,240	Miami Gardens (Host City: Miami)	Florida	Grass	Miami Dolphins†; Miami Hurricanes†; Orange Bowl	Multi-purpose stadium Marlins moved to their new ballpark and it was also host to WWE's WrestleMania XXVIII in 2012; Super Bowl XXIII, Super Bowl XXIX, Super Bowl XXXIII, Super Bowl XLI, and Super Bowl XLIV hosts Three BCS National Championship Games
	Reliant Stadium *	76,000	Houston	Texas	Grass	Houston Texans†; Texas Bowl	CONCACAF Gold Cup venue, 2010 MLS All-Star Game host, WrestleMania XXV hosts, NCAA Final Four 2011 & 2016 host, Super Bowl XXXVIII host, Retractable roof
	Arrowhead Stadium *	75,364	Kansas City	Missouri	Grass	Kansas City Chiefs†	
	Invesco Field at Mile High	75,165	Denver	Colorado	Grass	Denver Broncos†	2008 Democratic National Convention Host; 2006 National Football League AFC Championship Game
	Raymond James Stadium	75,000	Tampa	Florida	Grass	Tampa Bay Buccaneers†; South Florida Bulls†; Outback Bowl	Olympic qualifying venue. Super Bowl XXXV and Super Bowl XLIII hosts WrestleMania 36 original host
	Gillette Stadium *	73,393	Foxborough (Host City: Boston)	Massachusetts	FieldTurf	New England Patriots†; New England Revolution	NCAA Men's Lacrosse Championship in 2008 and 2009, 2003 FIFA Women's World Cup venue, and the MLS Cup 2002
	Husky Stadium	72,500	Seattle	(Washington (state)) Washington	FieldTurf	Washington Huskies†	Renovation completed in 2013. Track was removed but capacity decreased from 72,500 to 70,138. 1990 Goodwill Games track and field events.
	University of Phoenix Stadium	71,362	Glendale (Host City: Phoenix)	Arizona	Grass	Arizona Cardinals†; Fiesta Bowl	Retractable roof and playing surface CONCACAF Gold Cup venue Super Bowl XLII hosts WrestleMania XXVI hosts Three BCS National Championship Games
	Georgia Dome	71,228	Atlanta	(Georgia (U.S. state)) Georgia	FieldTurf & able to install grass.	Atlanta Falcons†; Georgia State Panthers†; Chick-fil-A Bowl	Indoor stadium Super Bowl XXXIV & Super Bowl XXVIII hosts World Football Challenge hosts Indoor Stadium, DCI Atlanta Southeastern Championship 1996 Summer Olympics World Football Challenge; WrestleMania XXVII hosts Demolished in 2017 following the opening of Mercedes-Benz Stadium
	M&T Bank Stadium	71,008	Baltimore	Maryland	Sportexe Momentum Turf	Baltimore Ravens†	Only stadium to sell out their World Football Challenge game
	Lincoln Financial Field *	69,111	Philadelphia	Pennsylvania	Grass	Philadelphia Eagles†; Temple Owls†; Army–Navy Game	2003 Women's World Cup venue CONCACAF Gold Cup venue.
	LP Field	69,143	Nashville	Tennessee	Grass	Tennessee Titans†; Tennessee State Tigers†; Music City Bowl	Olympic qualifying venue
	CenturyLink Field *	68,056	Seattle	(Washington (state)) Washington	FieldTurf	Seattle Seahawks†; Seattle Sounders FC	CONCACAF Gold Cup venue MLS Cup 2009 venue, Highest home attendance in MLS
	Qualcomm Stadium	67,700	San Diego	California	Grass	San Diego Chargers†; Holiday Bowl; Poinsettia Bowl	CONCACAF Gold Cup venue Super Bowl XXII, Super Bowl XXXII, and Super Bowl XXXVII Hosts; Demolished in 2021 and replaced by Snapdragon Stadium
	Lucas Oil Stadium	66,500	Indianapolis	Indiana	FieldTurf	Indianapolis Colts†	Built in 2008; Retractable roof Super Bowl XLVI in 2012, NCAA men's basketball Final Four in 2010 and 2015, NCAA women's basketball Final Four in 2016, DCI World Championship Finals Since 2009; NCAA men's basketball final in 2021

- * – Stadium that would go on to be used in the 2026 FIFA World Cup
- † – American football team.
- Although sponsored stadium names are listed in this article, they were not used in the actual bid documents, and would not be used during the World Cup. FIFA controls all naming rights related to the World Cup, and generally prohibits the use of such names. Even stadiums that bear the names of FIFA sponsors are subject to this restriction—the venue then known commercially as Coca-Cola Park in Johannesburg was known by its non-commercial name of Ellis Park Stadium during the 2010 World Cup, even though The Coca-Cola Company is one of FIFA's main sponsors.
- Capacities listed are estimated capacity for the FIFA World Cup.

=== Rejected venues ===
The following venues were considered as possible candidate venues but were not chosen to be included in the final bid.

Image	Stadium	Capacity	City	State	Surface	Home teams	Notes
	Michigan Stadium	109,901	Ann Arbor	Michigan	Artificial	Michigan Wolverines†	Largest non-motorsports stadium in the country, and third-largest non-racing stadium in the world.
	Jacksonville Municipal Stadium (Note: Now known as TIAA Bank Field.)	77,000	Jacksonville	Florida	Grass	Jacksonville Jaguars†; Gator Bowl	Super Bowl XXXIX hosts
	Bank of America Stadium	73,500	Charlotte	North Carolina	Grass	Carolina Panthers†; Belk Bowl; ACC Championship Game	1999 and 2000 NCAA Men's Soccer Championship venue, 2014 and 2015 International Champions Cup, 2015 CONCACAF Gold Cup
	Cleveland Browns Stadium (Note: Now known as FirstEnergy Stadium.)	73,200	Cleveland	Ohio	Grass	Cleveland Browns†	Hosted International Matches
	Edward Jones Dome (Note: Now known as The Dome at America's Center.)	67,268	St. Louis	Missouri	FieldTurf	St. Louis Rams (Note: The Rams returned to their previous home of Los Angeles after the 2015 NFL season, and the stadium has had no major sports tenant since then.)	Indoor stadium
	Ford Field	67,188	Detroit	Michigan	FieldTurf	Detroit Lions†; Little Caesars Pizza Bowl (Note: The Little Caesars Pizza Bowl folded after its 2013 edition and was replaced by the Quick Lane Bowl, also held at Ford Field.)	Super Bowl XL hosts WrestleMania 23 hosts Indoor stadium
	Citrus Bowl (Note: Now known as Camping World Stadium.)	65,616	Orlando	Florida	Grass	Florida Tuskers†; Capital One Bowl (Note: Now known as the Citrus Bowl.); Champs Sports Bowl (Note: Now known as the Camping World Bowl.)	1994 FIFA World Cup, 1996 Olympics and WrestleMania XXIV venue.
	O.co Coliseum (Note: Now known by its historic name of Oakland–Alameda County Coliseum.)	63,026	Oakland	California	Grass	Oakland Raiders†; Oakland A's‡	Multi-purpose stadium.
	Soldier Field	61,000	Chicago	Illinois	Grass	Chicago Bears†	1994 FIFA World Cup venue.
	Stanford Stadium	50,500	Palo Alto	California	Grass	Stanford Cardinal†	Rebuilt 1984 Olympics, 1994 FIFA World Cup and 1999 Women's World Cup venue
	RFK Stadium	45,600	Washington	District of Columbia	Grass	D.C. United (Note: D.C. United moved to Audi Field, also in Washington, in 2018.); EagleBank Bowl (Note: Now known as the Military Bowl, and played at Navy–Marine Corps Memorial Stadium in Annapolis, Maryland since 2013.)	1994 FIFA World Cup and 1996 Olympics venue

==== August 2009 cut ====
The following stadiums were eliminated in an earlier cut in August 2009

Image	Stadium	Capacity	City	State	Surface	Home teams	Events Hosted
	Legion Field	71,594	Birmingham	Alabama	Artificial	UAB Blazers†; Papajohns.com Bowl (Note: Now known as the Birmingham Bowl.)	1996 Olympics
	Ohio Stadium	102,329	Columbus	Ohio	Artificial	Ohio State Buckeyes†	On National Register of Historic Places
	Neyland Stadium	102,455	Knoxville	Tennessee	Grass	Tennessee Volunteers†	Ranked as America's No. 1 college football stadium by The Sporting News in 2001
	Metrodome	64,111	Minneapolis	Minnesota	Artificial	Minnesota Vikings†	1985 MLB All-Star Game; Super Bowl XXVI; 1992 and 2001 Final Four; 1987 and 1991 World Series venue. Demolished in 2014 and replaced on-site in 2016 by U.S. Bank Stadium.
	TCF Bank Stadium	50,805	Minneapolis	Minnesota	Artificial	Minnesota Golden Gophers† (Note: TCF Bank Stadium also went on to serve as home of Minnesota United FC during that team's first two seasons in Major League Soccer (2017–2018).)	One of three new Minneapolis stadiums (along with Target Field and U.S. Bank Stadium)
	Sun Devil Stadium	73,379	Tempe	Arizona	Grass	Arizona State Sun Devils†; Insight Bowl (Note: Now known as the Cactus Bowl, and since 2016 played at Chase Field in Phoenix.)	Super Bowl XXX former Fiesta Bowl venue
	Heinz Field	65,050	Pittsburgh	Pennsylvania	Grass	Pittsburgh Steelers†; Pittsburgh Panthers†	2011 NHL Winter Classic
	Rice-Eccles Stadium	45,017	Salt Lake City	Utah	Artificial	Utah Utes†	2002 Winter Olympics opening/closing venue
	Alamodome	65,000	San Antonio	Texas	Artificial	Alamo Bowl; Later became home to UTSA Roadrunners†	1998, 2004 and 2008 Final Four venue U.S. Army All-American Bowl
	Las Vegas Stadium	Proposed (Note: The stadium project ultimately materialized in the mid-2010s, with construction starting in late 2017. The stadium will be home to the relocated Oakland Raiders and the UNLV Rebels football team.)	Las Vegas	Nevada	Proposed	None	Proposed

==== June 2009 cut ====
The following stadiums were eliminated in an earlier cut in June 2009

Image	Stadium	Capacity	City	State	Surface	Home teams	Events Hosted
	California Memorial Stadium	71,799	Berkeley	California	Artificial	California Golden Bears†	
	Ralph Wilson Stadium	73,079	Orchard Park	New York	Artificial	Buffalo Bills†	2008 NHL Winter Classic
	Memorial Stadium (Champaign)	62,870	Champaign	Illinois	Artificial	Illinois Fighting Illini†	Hone of the Chicago Bears in 2002 while Soldier Field was being renovated
	Paul Brown Stadium	65,515	Cincinnati	Ohio	Artificial	Cincinnati Bengals†	Proposed for use in the 2026 World Cup bid
	Memorial Stadium (Clemson)	81,500	Clemson	South Carolina	Grass	Clemson Tigers†	Home of Carolina Panthers in their inaugural 1995 season
	Faurot Field	71,004	Columbia	Missouri	Artificial	Missouri Tigers†	Third-largest sports facility by seating capacity in the state of Missouri, behind The Dome at America's Center in St. Louis and Arrowhead Stadium in Kansas City.
	Williams-Brice Stadium	80,250	Columbia	South Carolina	Grass	South Carolina Gamecocks†	In 1987, Pope John Paul II, during a Papal visit to Columbia, spoke in front of 60,000 people at the stadium.
	Donald W. Reynolds Razorback Stadium	72,000	Fayetteville	Arkansas	Grass	Arkansas Razorbacks†	
	Ben Hill Griffin Stadium	88,548	Gainesville	Florida	Grass	Florida Gators†	1973 Tangerine Bowl and 1994 Gator Bowl venue
	Lambeau Field	72,928	Green Bay	Wisconsin	Grass	Green Bay Packers†	Frozen Tundra Hockey Classic
	Rice Stadium	70,000	Houston	Texas	Artificial	Rice Owls†	Bluebonnet Bowl 1959-1967, 1985-1986; Houston Oilers 1965-1967; Super Bowl VIII
	Kinnick Stadium	70,585	Iowa City	Iowa	Artificial	Iowa Hawkeyes†	
	Camp Randall Stadium	80,321	Madison	Wisconsin	Artificial	Wisconsin Badgers†	Culver's Camp Randall Hockey Classic; 12 Green Bay Packers exhibition games
	Commonwealth Stadium	67,942	Lexington	Kentucky	Grass	Kentucky Wildcats†	

==== Denied interest in hosting ====
- Sanford Stadium, Athens, Georgia; 1996 Summer Olympics soccer venue
- Jordan–Hare Stadium, Auburn, Alabama
- Darrell K Royal–Texas Memorial Stadium, Austin, Texas
- Tiger Stadium, Baton Rouge, Louisiana
- Lane Stadium, Blacksburg, Virginia
- Kyle Field, College Station, Texas
- Spartan Stadium, East Lansing, Michigan
- Memorial Stadium, Lincoln, Nebraska
- LaVell Edwards Stadium, Provo, Utah
- Notre Dame Stadium, South Bend, Indiana
- Beaver Stadium, State College, Pennsylvania
- Bryant–Denny Stadium, Tuscaloosa, Alabama

== Official bid partners ==
- Fox Soccer Channel
- AT&T
- American Airlines
- The Walt Disney Company
- Chevron Corporation
- Kohl's
- Subway Restaurants

== Aftermath ==
The American bid for the 2022 FIFA World Cup lost the hosting rights to Qatar on the fourth round of voting by 14 votes to 8, although exact vote counts were never publicly released by FIFA at the time, in keeping with the then-secret ballot system. The decision to award Qatar the 2022 World Cup was immediately mired in controversy, with widespread allegations of corruption, bribery, and improper conduct related to the bidding process.

These concerns were later central to what became known as the 2015 FIFA corruption case, where U.S. and Swiss authorities indicted and arrested numerous FIFA officials on charges including racketeering, wire fraud, and money laundering. The U.S. Department of Justice revealed that more than $150 million in bribes had been paid to secure commercial rights and influence decisions—including host selection—over several decades.

The United States would later be awarded the 2026 FIFA World Cup hosting rights in a joint bid with Canada and Mexico on June 13, 2018 at the 68th FIFA Congress held in Moscow, Russia. The United bid comfortably defeated the rival bid from Morocco by 134 votes to 65.
