= Daniel Flynn =

Daniel, Danny or Dan Flynn may refer to:

- Danny Flynn (printer) (born 1964), printer and designer
- Danny Flynn (artist), English fantasy and science fiction artist
- Danny Flynn (ice hockey) (born 1957), Canadian ice hockey coach
- Daniel Flynn (actor) (born 1961), English television actor
- Daniel Flynn (cricketer) (born 1985), New Zealand cricketer
- Daniel Flynn (cyclist) (1884–1980), track cyclist who competed for Great Britain in the 1908 Summer Olympics
- Daniel Flynn (footballer) (born 1994), former Australian rules footballer
- Daniel J. Flynn, American author and columnist
- Dan Flynn (politician) (1943–2022), member of the Texas House of Representatives
- Dan Flynn (boxer) (1888–1946), American heavyweight boxer
- Dan Flynn (soccer) (born 1955), CEO and Secretary General of U.S. Soccer (2000–2019)
