= 2018 Homeless World Cup =

Tournament details
- Host country: Mexico
- Dates: 13 November – 18 November
- Teams: 47 Men & 16 Women
- Venue: 1 (in 1 host city)

The 2018 Homeless World Cup was the 16th edition of the Homeless World Cup which took place in Zocalo, Mexico City from November 13–18.

More than 500 players representing 47 countries participated at the event. This was the second time Mexico hosted the tournament after the 2012 edition.

== Official mascots ==
The Mexico 2018 Homeless World Cup introduced 6 mascots, each representing a different continent, to celebrate the 50th anniversary of the Mexico 1968 Summer Olympic Games: Yagu the jaguar, Luga the lizard, Sasi the bird, Bon Li the rabbit, Lupo the wolf, and Jans the shark.

== Tournament rules ==
The winning team received 3 points. The losing team received zero points. If a match ended in a draw, it would be decided by a penalty shootout, and the winning team earned 2 points with 1 point going to the losing team. Games were 14 minutes long, in two seven-minute halves. The field was 22m long and 16m wide.

== Participating nations ==
The Homeless World Cup organization runs through 70 national partners from around the world, and supports football programs and social development. A total of 47 men's teams and 16 women's teams participated in the 2018 Homeless World Cup. Mexico ended up winning both the men's and women's tournaments.

List of Participating Nations
- Austria M
- Bosnia and Herzegovina M
- Brazil M&W
- Bulgaria M
- Burundi
- Chile M&W
- Colombia M&W
- Costa Rica M&W
- Croatia M
- Denmark M
- Egypt M&W
- England M&W
- Finland M
- France M
- Germany M
- Greece M&W
- Guatemala M
- Hong Kong M
- Hungary M
- India M&W
- Indonesia M
- Ireland M
- Italy M
- Kenya M
- Kyrgyzstan M
- Lithuania M
- Mexico M&W
- Namibia M
- Northern Ireland M&W
- Norway M&W
- Pakistan M
- Paraguay M&W
- Peru M&W
- Poland M
- Portugal M
- Russia M
- Scotland M&W
- Slovenia M
- South Africa M
- South Korea M
- Sweden M
- Switzerland M
- Ukraine M
- United States M&W
- Venezuela M
- Wales M&W
- Zimbabwe M

== Group stage ==
Key to colours in group tables
Teams that advanced to the Secondary stage

=== Group A ===
Team	Pld	Won	Penalty Win	Penalty Loss	Lost	Goals	Pts
Mexico	5	5	0	0	0	41	15
Hungary	5	4	0	0	1	30	12
Costa Rica	5	3	0	0	2	27	9
Peru	5	2	0	0	3	23	6
India	5	1	0	0	4	10	3
Denmark	5	0	0	0	5	13	0

=== Group B ===
Team	Pld	Won	Penalty Win	Penalty Loss	Lost	Goals	Pts
Brazil	5	4	1	0	0	27	14
South Africa	5	4	0	1	0	22	13
Indonesia	5	2	0	1	2	19	7
Zimbabwe	5	2	0	0	3	22	6
Norway	5	1	0	0	4	15	3
Scotland	5	0	1	0	4	18	2

=== Group C ===
Team	Pld	Won	Penalty Win	Penalty Loss	Lost	Goals	Pts

=== Group D ===
Team	Pld	Won	Penalty Win	Penalty Loss	Lost	Goals	Pts
Portugal	5	4	1	0	0	27	14
Chile	5	4	0	1	0	32	13
Russia	5	1	2	0	0	26	7
Austria	5	2	0	1	2	20	7
(Republic of Ireland) Ireland	5	1	0	1	3	19	4
Finland	5	0	0	0	5	15	0

=== Group E ===
Team	Pld	Won	Penalty Win	Penalty Loss	Lost	Goals	Pts

=== Group F ===
Team	Pld	Won	Penalty Win	Penalty Loss	Lost	Goals	Pts

=== Group G ===
Team	Pld	Won	Penalty Win	Penalty Loss	Lost	Goals	Pts

=== Group H ===
Team	Pld	Won	Penalty Win	Penalty Loss	Lost	Goals	Pts

=== The Homeless World Cup Finals ===
Fifth place
South Africa	0
Brazil	3
Seventh place
Lithuania	1
(Bosnia and Herzegovina) Bosnia & Herzegovina	7

Consolation semifinals
South Africa	5^{1}
Lithuania	5^{0}
Brazil	6
(Bosnia and Herzegovina) Bosnia & Herzegovina	5

Quarterfinals
Mexico	6
South Africa	5
Portugal	5
Lithuania	3
(Bosnia and Herzegovina) Bosnia & Herzegovina	3^{1}
Chile	3^{2}
Brazil	4
Hungary	6

Semifinals
Mexico	5
Portugal	4
Chile	7
Hungary	2

Final
Mexico	6
Chile	3
Third place
Portugal	5
Hungary	6

=== Winner ===
2018 Homeless World Cup Winners
Mexico
