= Harald Schmied =

Austrian charity worker (1968–2018)

Harald Schmied (13 May 1968 - 14 October 2018) was the Head of Communication & Fundraising of the Caritas Steiermark and was the founder - together with Mel Young - of the Homeless World Cup. He was married, had two sons and lived in Graz, Austria.

== Life ==
He grew up on Feistritz bei Knittelfeld, the son of the long-time mayor and director of the primary school, Heinz Schmied. After finishing the secondary school in Knittelfeld and attending the Senior High School in Shakopee, Minnesota he studied in Graz. From 1998 he was the chief editor of the street newspaper Das Megaphon. At a conference in Kapstadt he created together with Mel Young the idea of an international soccer-tournament with homeless people building the teams. This tournament - later called the Homeless World Cup - took place at first time in 2003 in the city centre of Graz, European Capital of Culture that year. In 2004 he left Megaphon and worked solely for the development of the Homeless World Cup.

== Honours ==
In March 2004 Harald Schmied received the Menschenrechtspreis des Landes Steiermark from Landeshauptfrau Waltraud Klasnic. On 26 August he and Mel Young received the UEFA Charity Cheque which was handed over by Ronaldinho. The prize was worth one million Swiss franc. In March 2017 he received the Decoration of Honour for Services to the Republic of Austria for cofounding and organization of the Homeless World Cup. In December 2017 Schmied and Gilbert Prilasnig were awarded with the Grazer Menschenrechtspreis.
