= Street Soccer USA =

American street soccer organisation

Street Soccer USA (SSUSA) is a non-profit organization, that promotes the growth and development of a national network of grassroots soccer programs. As of 2010, SSUSA has 18 teams across the United States. Street Soccer USA was started as part of the Urban Ministry Center in Charlotte, North Carolina.

SSUSA is the United States base partner of the Homeless World Cup and the host of the annual Street Soccer USA Cup, formerly the Homeless USA Cup, which has been held every year since the inaugural event in Charlotte in 2006.

== History ==
Lawrence Cann, a young social entrepreneur, founded Art Works Football Club in Charlotte, North Carolina in 2004. The program grew to a 16 city league of programs across the country, and Street Soccer USA became its own 501(c)3 organization in 2010.

SSUSA is the official partner of the annual Homeless World Cup, founded by Mel Young, and is responsible for organizing the United States' participation in the cup. SSUSA has brought a team of homeless soccer players to the Homeless World Cup since 2005.

=== Street Soccer USA Cup ===
Initially known as the Homeless USA Cup, the tournament began in Charlotte, North Carolina in 2006. Atlanta, Austin, Charlotte, Philadelphia, and New York were the cities participating in the event. In 2007, a conference was held in Charlotte to discuss expansion of the tournament for 2008. The 2008 tournament was held in Washington, DC, from June 26-29, and included 12 cities: Ann Arbor, Atlanta, Austin, Charlotte, Los Angeles, Minneapolis, New York, Phoenix, Richmond, San Francisco, St. Louis, and Washington, DC. It has since been hosted in Times Square, New York City, San Francisco's Civic Center Plaza, and the Philadelphia Art Museum steps.

The tournament is composed of homeless men and women from around the United States, with cities bringing teams of eight players to compete in the event. After the tournament, a committee selects 16 players from the tournament. Eight are chosen to represent the USA and the other eight will be alternates for the Homeless World Cup.

The cup is a four on four soccer tournament, with each team consisting of three field players and a goalkeeper. Every team must keep one player in the attacking half. Each game has two seven-minute halves, and takes place in a 52x73 ft walled in court. The walls are four feet tall and have nets that rise an additional 20 feet. The tournament has three stages, preliminary, group stage, and trophy stage.

Awards given at the cup include the MVP Award for the best all around player in the tournament, the Goalie Award for the best goalkeeper in the tournament, the Kastle Trophy for the most mixed team in the tournament (men and women), and the Spirit Award, the highest honor in the tournament, which is given to the team that embodies the best attitude on and off the field.

== Leadership ==
=== National Board of directors ===
Tim Howard

Steve Nash

Sheila Johnson

Charlie Stillitano

Jeff Rosenthal
