= 2012 Homeless World Cup =

- The Homeless World Cup logo

Tournament details
- Host country: Mexico
- City: Mexico City
- Dates: 6–14 October
- Venue: 1 (in 1 host city)

Final positions
- Champions: M: Chile; W:Mexico
- Runners-up: M: Mexico; W: Brazil
- Third place: M: Brazil; W: Chile
- Fourth place: M: Indonesia; W: Netherlands

The 2012 Homeless World Cup is the tenth edition of the Homeless World Cup and was hosted by Mexico City in October 2012 featuring selection teams consisting of homeless people from different countries. The winner of men's Homeless World Cup was Chile.

== Format ==
- The winning team gets 3 points. The losing team gets zero points. If a match ends in a draw, it is decided by sudden-death penalty shootout and the winning team gets three points and the losing team gets one point.
- Games are 14 minutes long, in two seven-minute halves.
- The field is 22m (long) x 16m (wide).

== Group stage ==
Key to colours in group tables
Teams that advanced to the Secondary stage

=== Group A ===
Team	Pld	Wins	Penalty Win	Penalty Loss	Cards	Goals	Pts
Mexico	5	5	0	0	0	54	15
South Africa	5	3	0	1	0	38	10
Haiti	5	3	0	1	0	30	10
Wales	5	2	0	1	0	26	7
Denmark	5	2	0	0	1	35	6
Canada	5	0	0	0	0	7	0

=== Group B ===
Team	Pld	Wins	Penalty Win	Penalty Loss	Cards	Goals	Pts
Costa Rica	5	5	0	1	0	38	16
(Republic of Ireland) Ireland	5	4	0	1	1	33	13
Norway	5	3	0	0	0	30	9
Argentina	5	2	0	0	1	22	6
Cambodia	5	1	0	0	0	15	3
Guatemala	5	0	0	0	0	17	0

=== Group C ===
Team	Pld	Wins	Penalty Win	Penalty Loss	Cards	Goals	Pts
(Bosnia and Herzegovina) Bosnia & Herzegovina	4	4	1	0	1	27	11
Poland	4	3	0	0	0	30	9
Ukraine	4	2	0	2	1	28	8
Finland	4	1	0	0	0	10	3
Switzerland	4	0	0	0	0	10	0

=== Group D ===
Team	Pld	Wins	Penalty Win	Penalty Loss	Cards	Goals	Pts
Indonesia	4	3	0	0	0	23	9
Scotland	4	2	0	3	1	20	9
Lithuania	4	3	1	0	0	20	8
Peru	4	2	0	0	0	19	6
Greece	4	0	0	1	0	9	1

=== Group E ===
Team	Pld	Wins	Penalty Win	Penalty Loss	Cards	Goals	Pts
Russia	5	5	0	0	0	32	15
Bulgaria	5	4	0	1	0	38	13
England	5	3	0	1	0	27	10
Hong Kong	5	2	0	0	0	24	6
France	5	1	0	0	1	16	3
Germany	5	0	0	2	0	19	2

=== Group F ===
Team	Pld	Wins	Penalty Win	Penalty Loss	Cards	Goals	Pts
Chile	3	3	0	0	0	35	9
Czech Republic	5	3	0	0	0	25	9
Hungary	5	2	0	0	0	20	6
Italy	5	1	0	1	0	28	4
Morocco	0	0	0	0	0	0	0

Morocco withdrew.

=== Group G ===
Team	Pld	Wins	Penalty Win	Penalty Loss	Cards	Goals	Pts
Portugal	4	4	0	0	0	34	12
Austria	4	3	0	1	0	34	10
Romania	4	2	0	2	0	22	8
Philippines	4	1	0	0	0	19	3
Sweden	4	0	0	0	0	7	0

=== Group H ===
Team	Pld	Wins	Penalty Win	Penalty Loss	Cards	Goals	Pts
Brazil	4	4	0	0	1	49	12
Netherlands	4	3	0	0	0	37	9
Namibia	4	2	0	1	0	35	7
United States	4	1	0	0	0	13	3
South Korea	4	0	0	0	0	4	0

== Secondary Stage ==
Key to colours in group tables
Teams that advanced to The Homeless World Cup
Teams that advanced to The INSP Trophy
Teams that advanced to The de la Calle a la Cancha Cup
Teams that advanced to The Fundación Telmex Cup
Teams that advanced to The Community Cup
Teams that advanced to The Mexico City Cup

=== Group A ===
Team	Pld	Wins	Penalty Win	Penalty Loss	Cards	Goals	Pts
Mexico	5	5	0	0	0	49	15
Lithuania	5	4	0	0	1	31	12
Costa Rica	5	2	0	1	2	18	7
Poland	5	2	1	0	2	27	5
England	5	1	0	1	0	11	4
Hungary	5	1	1	0	0	16	2

=== Group B ===
Team	Pld	Wins	Penalty Win	Penalty Loss	Cards	Goals	Pts
Indonesia	5	5	2	0	0	35	13
(Bosnia and Herzegovina) Bosnia & Herzegovina	5	4	1	0	0	33	11
Namibia	5	3	1	1	0	34	9
Bulgaria	5	2	0	1	1	32	7
Romania	5	1	0	2	0	15	5
Czech Republic	5	0	0	0	0	22	0

=== Group C ===
Team	Pld	Wins	Penalty Win	Penalty Loss	Cards	Goals	Pts
Chile	5	5	1	0	0	39	14
Austria	5	3	0	1	1	28	10
Haiti	5	3	1	1	1	33	9
Russia	5	2	0	0	0	14	6
Netherlands	5	2	0	0	4	23	6
Norway	5	0	0	0	1	11	0

=== Group D ===
Team	Pld	Wins	Penalty Win	Penalty Loss	Cards	Goals	Pts
Brazil	5	5	0	0	0	37	15
Portugal	5	4	1	0	0	34	11
South Africa	5	2	1	1	1	24	6
(Republic of Ireland) Ireland	5	2	2	1	0	20	5
Scotland	5	1	1	2	0	15	4
Ukraine	5	1	0	1	1	30	4

=== Group E ===
Team	Pld	Wins	Penalty Win	Penalty Loss	Cards	Goals	Pts
Argentina	5	5	0	0	0	45	15
Wales	5	3	0	1	0	36	10
Italy	5	3	1	1	0	32	9
Hong Kong	5	3	1	0	0	31	8
France	5	1	0	0	0	27	3
Sweden	5	0	0	0	0	11	0

=== Group F ===
Team	Pld	Wins	Penalty Win	Penalty Loss	Cards	Goals	Pts
Denmark	5	5	0	0	0	45	15
Peru	5	4	0	0	1	38	12
Philippines	5	3	0	0	0	26	9
Cambodia	5	2	0	0	0	28	6
United States	5	1	0	0	0	19	3
Finland	5	0	0	0	0	13	0

=== Group G ===
Team	Pld	Wins	Penalty Win	Penalty Loss	Cards	Goals	Pts
Guatemala	6	6	2	0	0	43	16
Greece	6	4	1	1	0	23	12
Canada	6	4	0	0	1	28	12
Germany	6	3	0	2	1	42	11
Morocco	6	2	0	0	0	24	6
Switzerland	6	2	0	0	0	27	6
South Korea	6	0	0	0	1	9	0

== Trophy Stage ==
Qualified teams to play for different trophies:

The Homeless World Cup	The Fundación Telmex Cup	The Mexico City Cup	The de la Calle a la Cancha Cup	The Community Cup	The INSP Trophy
Austria; Brazil; Chile; Lithuania; Mexico; Portugal; Indonesia (Bosnia and Herzegovina) Bosnia & Herzegovina	Costa Rica (Republic of Ireland) Ireland; Namibia; Poland; Russia; South Africa; Haiti; Bulgaria	Czech Republic; England; Hungary; Netherlands; Norway; Romania; Scotland; Ukraine	Argentina; Cambodia; Denmark; Hong Kong; Italy; Philippines; Wales; Peru	Canada; France; Germany; Greece; Switzerland; United States; Guatemala; Morocco	Finland; South Korea; Sweden

== The Homeless World Cup ==
=== The Homeless World Cup Finals ===
Fifth place
(Bosnia and Herzegovina) Bosnia & Herzegovina	4
Portugal	7
Seventh place
Lithuania	4
Austria	7

Consolation semifinals
(Bosnia and Herzegovina) Bosnia & Herzegovina	3
Lithuania	1
Portugal	6
Austria	3

Quarterfinals
Mexico	6
(Bosnia and Herzegovina) Bosnia & Herzegovina	4
Indonesia	8
Lithuania	5
Chile	6
Portugal	4
Brazil	9
Austria	0

Semifinals
Mexico	9
Indonesia	6
Chile	3
Brazil	3

Final
Mexico	5
Chile	8
Third place
Brazil	6
Indonesia	2

=== Winner ===
2012 Homeless World Cup Winners
Chile
1st Title

== Classification Positions ==
=== The Fundación Telmex Cup ===
Fifth place
South Africa	7
Bulgaria	3
Seventh place
Poland	9
Republic of Ireland	5

Consolation semifinals
Republic of Ireland	3
South Africa	7
Bulgaria	6
Poland	5

Quarterfinals
Costa Rica	6
Bulgaria	1
Poland	2
Namibia	9
Haiti	5
Republic of Ireland	3
Russia	6
South Africa	5

Semifinals
Costa Rica	4
Namibia	7
Haiti	5
Russia	3

Final
Namibia	7
Haiti	4
Third place
Costa Rica	3
Russia	4

=== Winner ===
2012 The Fundación Telmex Cup Winners
Namibia
1st Title

== Final ranking ==
Rank	Team	Record
1st place, gold medalist(s)	Chile	10–2–0
2nd place, silver medalist(s)	Mexico	12–0–1
3rd place, bronze medalist(s)	Brazil	11–0–1
4	Indonesia	7–2–2
5	Portugal	10–1–1
6	(Bosnia and Herzegovina) Bosnia & Herzegovina	9–1–2
7	Austria	7–0–5
8	Lithuania	7–1–4
9	Namibia	0–0–0
10	Haiti	0–0–0
11	Russia	0–0–0
12	Costa Rica	0–0–0
13	South Africa	0–0–0
14	Bulgaria	0–0–0
15	Poland	0–0–0
16	(Republic of Ireland) Ireland	0–0–0

Record: Wins - Penalty Wins - Losses
