= Homeless World Cup =

Annual association football tournament

- Founded: 2001
- Region: Worldwide
- Current champions: M: Egypt (1st title); W: Uganda (1st title)
- Most championships: M: Mexico (5 titles); W: Mexico (9 titles)
- Broadcaster: FIFA+
- Website: www.homelessworldcup.org

The Homeless World Cup (HWC) is an annual association football tournament organized by the Homeless World Cup Foundation, a social organization which advocates the end of homelessness through the sport. The organization puts together an annual football tournament where teams of homeless people from various countries compete.

The tournament was first held in 1999, and in 2008 it added a women's competition. From 2010 onwards, all tournaments have featured both men's and women's teams.

== History ==
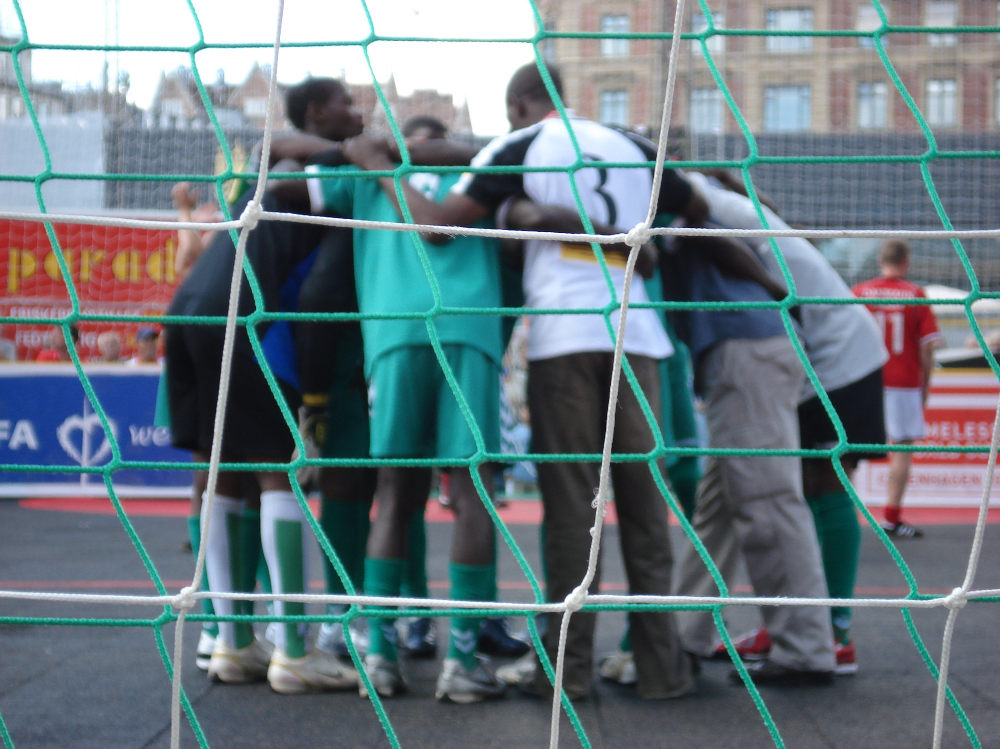
Players huddle during the Homeless World Cup 2007 in Copenhagen

The Homeless World Cup organization was co-founded by Mel Young and Harald Schmied in 2001 to advocate for a global solution to homelessness. The first annual football tournament for homeless people took place in 2003 in Graz, Austria. Host cities since then have included Gothenburg, Edinburgh, Cape Town, Copenhagen, Melbourne, Milan, Rio de Janeiro, Paris, Poznań, Santiago, Amsterdam, Glasgow, Oslo, Mexico City, and Cardiff.

The 2019 edition was hosted by Wales in Bute Park, Cardiff, with Michael Sheen opening the tournament. The 2020 tournament had been due to take place in Tampere, Finland, but was cancelled as a result of the COVID-19 pandemic.

The 2023 tournament took place in Sacramento, California, and the 2024 edition took place in Seoul, Korea.

The international headquarters of the Homeless World Cup is located at 23 Union Street, in Edinburgh, Scotland.

== National partners ==
The Homeless World Cup organization operates through a network of more than 79 national partners around the world, supporting football programs and social enterprise development.

- Afghanistan
- Argentina
- Australia
- Austria
- Belgium
- Bosnia and Herzegovina
- Brazil
- Bulgaria
- Burundi
- Cambodia
- Cameroon
- Canada
- Chile
- Colombia
- Costa Rica
- Croatia
- Czech Republic
- Denmark
- Egypt
- England
- Ethiopia
- Finland
- France
- Germany
- Ghana
- Greece
- Grenada
- Haiti
- Hong Kong
- Hungary
- India
- Indonesia
- Ireland
- Israel
- Italy
- Ivory Coast
- Japan
- Kazakhstan
- Kenya
- Kyrgyzstan
- Liberia
- Lithuania
- Luxembourg
- Malawi
- Mexico
- Moldova
- Namibia
- Netherlands
- New Zealand
- Nigeria
- Northern Ireland
- Norway
- Pakistan
- Palestine
- Paraguay
- Peru
- Philippines
- Poland
- Portugal
- Romania
- Russia
- Rwanda
- Scotland
- Serbia
- Sierra Leone
- Singapore
- Slovakia
- Slovenia
- South Africa
- South Korea
- Spain
- Sweden
- Switzerland
- Timor-Leste
- Uganda
- Ukraine
- United States
- Vietnam
- Wales
- Zambia
- Zimbabwe

== Members ==
There are 75 Nations in October 2023, split into 5 regions:

1. Africa (14): Burkina Faso, Egypt, Ghana, Ivory Coast, Kenya, Liberia, Malawi, Namibia, Nigeria, South Africa, Tanzania, Uganda, Zambia, Zimbabwe
2. Asia & Oceania (12): Australia, Bangladesh, Cambodia, Hong Kong, India, Indonesia, Japan, Kyrgyzstan, Nepal, Philippines, South Korea, Vietnam
3. Europe (31): Austria, Belgium, Bosnia & Herzegovina, Bulgaria, Croatia, Czech Republic, Denmark, England, Finland, France, Germany, Greece, Hungary, Ireland, Italy, Lithuania, Netherlands, Northern Ireland, Norway, Poland, Portugal, Romania, Russia, Scotland, Slovenia, Spain, Sweden, Switzerland, Ukraine, Wales
4. North America & Central America & The Caribbean (6): Costa Rica, Grenada, Guatemala, Mexico, Panama, USA
5. South America (6): Argentina, Brazil, Chile, Colombia, Paraguay, Peru

== Format ==
=== Fields ===
Since 2015 the tournament has been played on synthetic turf fields from Act Global.

=== Rules ===
==== Player eligibility ====
Players must meet all of the following criteria:

- Be at least 16 years old at the time of the tournament
- Have not taken part in previous Homeless World Cup tournaments

Also, must be any of the following:

- Have been homeless at some point after the previous year's tournament in accordance with the national definition of homelessness
- Make their main living income as a streetpaper vendor
- Be asylum seekers currently without positive asylum status or who were previously asylum seekers but obtained residency status a year before the event
- Currently be in drug or alcohol rehabilitation and also have been homeless at some point in the past two years

==== Participants ====
A maximum of 4 players per team on the court:

- 3 outfield players,
- 1 goalkeeper,
- Plus 4 substitution players (rolling substitution allowed)

==== Tournament details ====
The winning team gets 3 points. The losing team gets zero points. If a match ends in a draw, it is decided by sudden-death penalty shootout and the winning team gets two points and the losing team gets one point. Games are 14 minutes long, in two seven-minute halves. The field measures 22m long x 16m wide.

== Broadcast ==
FIFA+ broadcasts the Homeless World Cup.

== Results ==
=== Men ===
#	Year	Host	Winners	Score	Runners-up	Third place	Score	Fourth place	Teams
1	2003; Details	Graz, Austria	Austria	2–1	England	Netherlands	11–5	Brazil	18
2	2004; Details	Gothenburg, Sweden	Italy	4–0	Austria	Poland	7–4	Scotland	26
3	2005; Details	Edinburgh, Scotland	Italy	9–3	Poland	Ukraine	11–5	Scotland	27
4	2006; Details	Cape Town, South Africa	Russia	1–0	Kazakhstan	Poland	3–1	Mexico	26
5	2007; Details	Copenhagen, Denmark	Scotland	9–3	Poland	Liberia	11–5	Denmark	48
6	2008; Details	Melbourne, Australia	Afghanistan	5–4	Russia	Ghana	6–4	Scotland	45
7	2009; Details	Milan, Italy	Ukraine	5–4	Portugal	Brazil	3–2	Nigeria	48
8	2010; Details	Rio de Janeiro, Brazil	Brazil	6–0	Chile	Mexico	4–4 (1–0p)	Portugal	43
9	2011; Details	Paris, France	Scotland	4–3	Mexico	Brazil	7–1	Kenya	48
10	2012; Details	Mexico City, Mexico	Chile	8–5	Mexico	Brazil	6–2	Indonesia	43
11	2013; Details	Poznań, Poland	Brazil	3–3 (1–0p)	Mexico	Russia	6–6 (1–0p)	Chile	46
12	2014; Details	Santiago, Chile	Chile	5–2	Bosnia and Herzegovina	Poland	6–6 (1–0p)	Brazil	42
13	2015; Details	Amsterdam, Netherlands	Mexico	5–2	Ukraine	Portugal	2–2 (1–0p)	Brazil	47
14	2016; Details	Glasgow, Scotland	Mexico	6–1	Brazil	Russia	3–1	Chile	44
15	2017; Details	Oslo, Norway	Brazil	4–3	Mexico	Russia	5–3	Chile	45
16	2018; Details	Mexico City, Mexico	Mexico	6–3	Chile	Hungary	6–5	Portugal	40
17	2019; Details	Cardiff, Wales	Mexico	5–1	Chile	Russia	7–7 (1–0p)	Portugal	44
18	2023; Details	Sacramento, United States	Chile	5–3	Mexico	Brazil	7–5	Portugal	28
19	2024; Details	Seoul, South Korea	Mexico	6–5	England	Lithuania	2–1	Indonesia	52
20	2025; Details	Oslo, Norway	Egypt	4–3	Portugal	Kenya		Romania	48

=== Participating nations ===
Nation	2003 (Austria) (18)	2004 (Sweden) (26)	2005 (Scotland) (27)	2006 (South Africa) (48)	2007 (Denmark) (48)	2008 (Australia) (45)	2009 (Italy) (48)	2010 (Brazil) (43)	2011 (France) (48)	2012 (Mexico) (43)	2013 (Poland) (46)	2014 (Chile) (42)	2015 (Netherlands) (47)	2016 (Scotland) (44)	2017 (Norway) (45)	2018 (Mexico) (40)	2019 (Wales) (44)	2023 (United States) (28)	2024 (South Korea) (52)
Afghanistan				12th	20th	1st													
Argentina		14th	13th	42nd	38th	28th	26th	33rd	26th	12th	22nd	24th	20th						
Australia			7th	43rd	43rd	22nd	43rd		37th		45th			39th	43rd		39th	23rd	
Austria	1st	2nd	8th	45th	33rd	15th	23rd	17th	21st	7th	10th	23rd	25th	40th	9th	16th	8th	14th	
Belgium						45th	41st	12th	34th		25th		37th	31st	40th		40th		
Bosnia and Herzegovina										6th	6th	2nd	13th	8th	7th	7th	6th		
Brazil	4th	15th	11th	16th	22nd	7th	3rd	1st	3rd	3rd	1st	4th	4th	2nd	1st	5th	13th	3rd	
Bulgaria										22nd	17th	12th	9th	17th	10th	12th	12th	6th	
Burundi				41st	27th														
Cambodia						43rd	42nd	39th	45th	16th	35th	39th	36th	33rd	34th		36th		
Cameroon				6th	8th														
Canada		16th	20th	35th	40th	42nd	28th	40th	46th	27th	40th	41st	44th						
Chile				23rd		34th	9th	2nd	5th	1st	4th	1st	7th	4th	4th	2nd	2nd	1st	
Colombia																25th			
Costa Rica							14th	19th	13th	20th	18th	15th	8th	11th	14th	11th	11th	5th	
Croatia					46th		45th	30th	22nd		28th					31st	33rd		
Czech Republic		23rd	25th	15th	15th	35th	36th	23rd	23rd	35th	27th	40th	30th	41st	39th		37th		
Denmark	6th	9th		7th	4th		32nd		17th	11th	23rd	26th	31st	16th	17th	20th	28th	21st	
Egypt														10th	13th		5th		
England	2nd	6th	9th	13th	29th	6th	10th	15th	12th	38th	44th	31st	27th	22nd	30th	32nd	30th		
Estonia				31st															
Ethiopia						27th													
Finland				18th	28th	32nd	31st	27th	42nd	41st	41st	37th	45th	28th	38th	24th	41st	14th	
France		21st	26th	24th	21st	18th	11th	29th	29th	26th	16th	28th	26th		27th	33rd	14th		
Germany	16th	22nd	16th	22nd	23rd	12th	21st	32nd	43rd	29th	33rd	18th	46th	30th	33rd	38th	26th	26th	
Ghana				20th	10th	3rd	6th	8th	35th			19th							
Greece					35th	30th	24th	38th	31st	31st	32nd	22nd	41st	43rd	44th	36th	44th	28th	
Grenada													34th	27th	26th				
Guatemala										25th						34th			
Haiti										18th									
Hong Kong			21st	44th	47th	24th	40th	37th	40th	15th	37th	20th	32nd	32nd	37th	28th	38th		
Hungary				36th	12th	23rd	20th	31st	38th	40th	21st	11th	29th	6th	32nd	3rd	18th	13th	
India					45th	39th	39th	35th	33rd		30th	33rd	33rd	24th	18th	21st	25th		
Indonesia									6th	4th	8th	10th	17th	7th	5th	10th	20th	17th	
Ireland	14th	17th	5th	17th	30th	9th	5th	6th	11th	24th	11th	16th	10th	9th	8th	17th	17th		
Italy	5th	1st	1st	30th	14th	14th	25th	21st	19th	14th	24th	27th	43rd	23rd	24th	30th	21st	12th	
Ivory Coast							48th							36th			27th		
Japan		25th					44th		48th										
Kazakhstan				2nd	9th		47th												
Kenya				9th	6th	5th		5th	4th										
Kyrgyzstan					41st		27th		27th			36th				23rd			
Liberia				5th	3rd														
Lithuania				26th	17th	19th	13th	18th	16th	8th	14th	14th	28th	15th	31st	8th	10th	7th	
Luxembourg							30th	24th			38th								
Malawi				48th		41st	18th												
Mexico				4th	26th	25th	7th	3rd	2nd	2nd	2nd	9th	1st	1st	2nd	1st	1st	2nd	
Morocco										32nd									
Namibia		19th	14th	29th		38th	35th	28th	30th	17th	20th	7th	14th	12th					
Netherlands	3rd	12th	6th	14th	25th	20th	16th	16th	15th	34th	9th	8th	11th	37th	23rd		31st		
New Zealand						40th		42nd											
Nigeria				8th	5th	10th	4th		7th										
Northern Ireland											31st	25th	24th	13th	12th	29th	29th	8th	
Norway			23rd	47th	37th	16th	37th	26th	36th	36th	34th	30th	18th	29th	21st	22nd	23rd	24th	
Pakistan																	42nd	25th	
Palestine								10th	25th										
Paraguay				32nd															
Peru										9th		13th	22nd		22nd	13th			
Philippines						37th	29th	25th	24th	13th	29th		38th						
Poland	12th	3rd	2nd	3rd	2nd	13th	8th	13th	10th	23rd	15th	3rd	12th	18th	29th	15th	9th	9th	
Portugal		18th	10th	11th	7th	11th	2nd	4th	14th	5th	5th	6th	3rd	5th	6th	4th	4th	4th	
Romania						26th	22nd	22nd	41st	33rd	7th	17th	6th	19th	11th	18th			
Russia	13th	5th	12th	1st	13th	2nd	15th	7th	9th	19th	3rd	5th	19th	3rd	3rd	9th	3rd		
Rwanda				19th		33rd													
Scotland	11th	4th	4th	33rd	1st	4th	12th	14th	1st	37th	12th	21st	16th	21st	25th	19th	24th	22nd	
Serbia				37th	18th														
Sierra Leone						36th													
Slovakia	10th	26th	24th	34th	24th														
Slovenia					42nd			41st	32nd		26th	29th	21st	44th	45th	40th	35th		
South Africa	7th	8th	18th	27th	16th	21st	17th	11th	20th	21st	19th		5th	14th	16th	6th	7th		
South Korea								43rd	39th	43rd	46th	42nd	40th	42nd	42nd	39th	32nd	19th	
Spain	15th	20th	19th	39th	32nd		46th		47th										
Sweden	8th	7th	22nd	40th	44th	44th	34th	34th	44th	42nd	42nd	38th	47th	34th	41st	37th	34th	18th	
Switzerland	18th	24th	15th	38th	48th		38th	36th	28th	30th	39th	34th	42nd	38th	20th	26th	15th	20th	
Timor-Leste						31st													
Uganda				21st	39th														
Ukraine		10th	3rd	10th	11th	8th	1st	9th	8th	39th	13th		2nd		15th			10th	
United States	9th	13th	27th	46th	36th	29th	19th	20th	18th	28th	43rd	35th	23rd	35th	28th	27th	22nd	11th	
Wales	17th	11th	17th		31st		33rd			10th	36th	32nd	39th	25th	35th	35th	16th	15th	
Zambia				25th	19th														
Zimbabwe				28th	34th	17th							15th	26th	19th	14th	19th		
Street Soccer United														20th					
Union Gospel Mission																		27th	

=== Women ===
#	Year	Host	Winners	Score	Runners-up	Third place	Score	Fourth place	Teams
1	2008; Details	Melbourne, Australia	Zambia	7–1	Liberia	Cameroon		Colombia	8
2	2010; Details	Rio de Janeiro, Brazil	Brazil	7–3	Mexico	Haiti		Colombia	12
3	2011; Details	Paris, France	Kenya	4–3	Mexico	Brazil		Argentina	16
4	2012; Details	Mexico City, Mexico	Mexico	6–2	Brazil	Chile		Netherlands	13
5	2013; Details	Poznań, Poland	Mexico	4–1	Chile	Hungary		Kyrgyzstan	13
6	2014; Details	Santiago, Chile	Chile	4–3	Mexico	Brazil		Hungary	12
7	2015; Details	Amsterdam, Netherlands	Mexico	3–1	Chile	Norway		Hungary	16
8	2016; Details	Glasgow, Scotland	Mexico	5–0	Kyrgyzstan	Chile	6–6 (1–0p)	Scotland	14
9	2017; Details	Oslo, Norway	Mexico	4–2	Chile	Kenya		Kyrgyzstan	19
10	2018; Details	Mexico City, Mexico	Mexico	5–3	Colombia	Chile		Brazil	16
11	2019; Details	Cardiff, Wales	Mexico	5–1	Peru	Romania	3–3 (2–1p)	Chile	16
12	2023; Details	Sacramento, United States	Mexico	2–0	Chile	Romania	7–4	Republic of Ireland	12
13	2024; Details	Seoul, South Korea	Mexico	5–2	Romania	Poland	3–1	Egypt	
14	2025; Details	Oslo, Norway	Uganda	6–0	Mexico	Poland		South Africa	

=== Participating nations ===
Nation	2008 (Australia) (8)	2010 (Brazil) (12)	2011 (France) (16)	2012 (Mexico) (13)	2013 (Poland) (13)	2014 (Chile) (12)	2015 (Netherlands) (16)	2016 (Scotland) (14)	2017 (Norway) (19)	2018 (Mexico) (16)	2019 (Wales) (16)	2023 (United States) (12)	2024 (South Korea) ( )
Argentina		8th	4th	7th	5th	5th	5th	9th					
Australia	8th												
Austria											6th	10th	
Belgium							14th		19th		13th		
Brazil		1st	3rd	2nd		3rd				4th			
Bulgaria					7th								
Cameroon	3rd												
Canada			14th	12th									
Chile				3rd	2nd	1st	2nd	3rd	2nd	3rd	4th	2nd	
Colombia	4th	4th	7th	8th						2nd			
Costa Rica										5th			
Denmark					11th		8th					6th	
Egypt							16th		6th	6th			
England				9th	9th	7th	15th	5th	8th	10th	8th		
Finland							12th					12th	
France			10th					13th	5th			9th	
Greece								10th	12th	16th			
Haiti		3rd	9th										
Hungary				6th	3rd	4th	4th		13th		5th		
India		12th	13th			10th	6th	7th	7th	9th	7th		
Ireland									11th			4th	
Ivory Coast								14th					
Kenya			1st						3rd				
Kyrgyzstan	5th	5th		5th	4th			2nd	4th				
Liberia	2nd												
Malawi			6th										
Mexico		2nd	2nd	1st	1st	2nd	1st	1st	1st	1st	1st	1st	
Netherlands		6th	11th	4th	6th	6th	11th	6th	10th		12th		
Northern Ireland									16th	14th	15th		
Norway		9th	8th			11th	3rd	12th	14th	7th	10th	11th	
Paraguay	6th	7th	12th	11th						15th			
Peru										8th	2nd		
Poland					8th								
Romania											3rd	3rd	
Scotland			5th				7th	4th	9th	11th			
Sweden					12th	12th	10th		15th		14th	7th	
Uganda	7th	10th	16th										
United States		11th	15th	10th	13th	9th	13th	8th	18th	12th	9th	5th	
Wales					10th	8th	9th	11th	17th	13th	11th	8th	
Zambia	1st												
Street Football United											16th		

== Performance by country ==
=== Men ===
Team	Titles	Runners-up	Third place	Fourth place	Top 4 finishes	Top 3 finishes	Top 2 finishes
Mexico	5 (2015, 2016, 2018, 2019, 2024)	4 (2011, 2012, 2013, 2017)	1 (2010)	1 (2006)	10	9	8
Brazil	3 (2010, 2013, 2017)	1 (2016)	3 (2009, 2011, 2012)	3 (2003, 2014, 2015)	10	7	4
Chile	3 (2012, 2014, 2023)	3 (2010, 2018, 2019)	0	3 (2013, 2016, 2017)	7	4	4
Scotland	2 (2007, 2011)	0	0	3 (2004, 2005, 2008)	5	2	2
Italy	2 (2004, 2005)	0	0	0	2	2	2
Russia	1 (2006)	1 (2008)	4 (2013, 2016, 2017, 2019)	0	5	5	2
Austria	1 (2003)	1 (2004)	0	0	2	2	2
Ukraine	1 (2009)	1 (2015)	1 (2005)	0	3	3	2
Afghanistan	1 (2008)	0	0	0	1	1	1
Poland	0	2 (2005, 2007)	3 (2004, 2006, 2014)	0	5	5	2
Portugal	0	1 (2009)	1 (2015)	3 (2010, 2018, 2019)	4	2	1
Bosnia and Herzegovina	0	1 (2014)	0	0	1	1	1
England	0	2 (2003,2024)	0	0	1	1	1
Kazakhstan	0	1 (2006)	0	0	1	1	1
Ghana	0	0	1 (2008)	0	1	1	0
Hungary	0	0	1 (2018)	0	1	1	0
Liberia	0	0	1 (2007)	0	1	1	0
Netherlands	0	0	1 (2003)	0	1	1	0
Denmark	0	0	0	1 (2007)	1	0	0
Indonesia	0	0	0	1 (2012)	1	0	0
Kenya	0	0	0	1 (2011)	1	0	0
Nigeria	0	0	0	1 (2009)	1	0	0

=== Women ===
Team	Titles	Runners-up	Third place	Fourth place	Top 4 finishes	Top 3 finishes	Top 2 finishes
Mexico	9 (2012, 2013, 2015, 2016, 2017, 2018, 2019, 2023, 2024)	3 (2010, 2011, 2014)	0	0	10	10	10
Chile	1 (2014)	3 (2013, 2015, 2017)	3 (2012, 2016, 2018)	1 (2019)	8	7	4
Brazil	1 (2010)	1 (2012)	2 (2011, 2014)	1 (2018)	5	4	2
Zambia	1 (2008)	0	0	0	1	1	1
Kenya	1 (2011)	0	0	0	1	1	1
Kyrgyzstan	0	1 (2016)	0	2 (2013, 2017)	3	1	1
Colombia	0	1 (2018)	0	2 (2008, 2010)	3	1	1
Liberia	0	1 (2008)	0	0	1	1	1
Peru	0	1 (2019)	0	0	1	0	0
Hungary	0	0	1 (2013)	2 (2014, 2015)	3	1	0
Cameroon	0	0	1 (2008)	0	1	1	0
Haiti	0	0	1 (2010)	0	1	1	0
Norway	0	0	1 (2015)	0	1	1	0
Romania	0	1 (2024)	1 (2019)	0	1	1	0
Argentina	0	0	0	1 (2011)	1	0	0
Netherlands	0	0	0	1 (2012)	1	0	0
Scotland	0	0	0	1 (2016)	1	0	0

== Medals ==
=== Men (2003—2023) ===
Rank	Nation	Gold	Silver	Bronze	Total
1	Mexico (MEX)	5	5	1	11
2	Chile (CHI)	3	3	0	6
3	Brazil (BRA)	3	1	4	8
4	Italy (ITA)	2	0	0	2
4	Scotland (SCO)	2	0	0	2
6	Russia (RUS)	1	1	4	6
7	Ukraine (UKR)	1	1	1	3
8	Austria (AUT)	1	1	0	2
9	Afghanistan (AFG)	1	0	0	1
10	Poland (POL)	0	2	3	5
11	England (ENG)	0	2	0	2
12	Portugal (POR)	0	1	1	2
13	Bosnia and Herzegovina (BIH)	0	1	0	1
13	Kazakhstan (KAZ)	0	1	0	1
15	Ghana (GHA)	0	0	1	1
15	Hungary (HUN)	0	0	1	1
15	Liberia (LBR)	0	0	1	1
15	Netherlands (NED)	0	0	1	1
Totals (18 entries)		19	19	18	56

=== Women (2008—2023) ===
Rank	Nation	Gold	Silver	Bronze	Total
1	Mexico (MEX)	9	3	0	12
2	Chile (CHI)	1	4	3	8
3	Brazil (BRA)	1	1	2	4
4	Kenya (KEN)	1	0	0	1
4	Zambia (ZAM)	1	0	0	1
6	Romania (ROU)	0	1	2	3
7	Colombia (COL)	0	1	0	1
7	Kyrgyzstan (KGZ)	0	1	0	1
7	Liberia (LBR)	0	1	0	1
7	Peru (PER)	0	1	0	1
11	Cambodia (CAM)	0	0	1	1
11	Cameroon (CMR)	0	0	1	1
11	Haiti (HAI)	0	0	1	1
11	Hungary (HUN)	0	0	1	1
11	Norway (NOR)	0	0	1	1
Totals (15 entries)		13	13	12	38

== Media coverage ==
Journalist Rick Reilly said "Homeless soccer turned out to be one of the best things I've covered in all my years. Seeing these people finally getting cheered, finally feeling some self-worth, was great. It was great to see these guys caring about something other than booze or where they're going to find food or where they're going to sleep – just getting to be regular people for once."

Several TV documentaries have been made tracking the participation of teams from homelessness to participating at the annual event.

In 2011, a 90-minute documentary called Hors-Jeu: Carton rouge contre l'exclusion was broadcast by Canal+ and focused on the Paris 2011 Homeless World Cup and Homeless World Cup itself and five national partners: Japan, Argentina, Palestine, France and Kenya. It was aired in France on 9 October 2011. The documentary was directed by Jérôme Mignard and Thomas Risch.

The 2006 Homeless World Cup was the subject of a documentary entitled Kicking It. directed by Susan Koch and Jeff Werner focusing on the experiences of seven homeless people at the Homeless World Cup football (soccer) game in South Africa. Featured in the documentary, narrated by actor Colin Farrell were residents of Afghanistan; Kenya; Dublin, Ireland; Charlotte, North Carolina, U.S.; Madrid, Spain and St. Petersburg in Russia. The film premiered in January, 2008 at the Sundance Film Festival, distributed by Liberation Entertainment, Netflix and ESPN.

In 2023, the South Korean comedy-drama film Dream was released, centering on a football player who receives disciplinary provision and is given the job of coaching the national football team for the Homeless World Cup. Directed by Lee Byeong-heon and starring Park Seo-joon and Lee Ji-eun, it was the twelfth highest-grossing Korean film of the year.

In 2024, The Beautiful Game was released on Netflix. The sports drama film written by Frank Cottrell-Boyce and directed by Thea Sharrock, it centers around the English football squad as they compete in the Homeless World Cup. The film stars Bill Nighy, Micheal Ward, Valeria Golino and Susan Wokoma in leading roles.

== See also ==
- Homeless Workers' Movement
