= Dan Flynn (soccer) =

Daniel T. Flynn (born January 20, 1955) is a former CEO and Secretary General for the U.S. Soccer Federation, the governing body for the sport of soccer in the United States, serving from 2000 to 2019. He was succeeded by Brian Remedi, former Chief Stakeholder Officer for the organization, who was fired less than a year later in April 2020.

== Career ==
A native of Saint Louis, Missouri, Flynn played for youth teams at St. Philip Neri, McBride High School (until it closed in 1971) and St. Louis University High School. He played collegiately as a defender for the St. Louis University Billikens from 1973 to 1977. Coached by the legendary Harry Keough, Flynn helped the Bills capture the NCAA Championship in 1973, (the last of an astounding 10 championships in 15 years from 1959 to 1973), and a runner-up finish in 1974. Flynn was inducted into the university's Billiken Hall of Fame in 2000. In January 1978, he was selected by the Tampa Bay Rowdies in the second round of the North American Soccer League's college draft, but did not make the team because of recurring knee problems. He later worked in the sports marketing division of Anheuser-Busch, ultimately rising to President of Anheuser-Busch, International, Inc., at age 31.

Flynn played several roles in soccer administration, beginning with the 1994 FIFA World Cup, for which he served as the Venue Executive Director in Chicago. For the four years immediately following, he served as the Chief Administrative Officer, then as Chief Operating Officer, of U.S. Soccer. From 1998 to 2000, Flynn served as executive director of the U.S. Soccer Foundation, before returning to the U.S. Soccer Federation as its CEO and Secretary General. During his nearly two-decades-long stint as CEO/Secretary General, he served in numerous other capacities, including as CEO of the 2003 FIFA Women's World Cup in the United States, and on the board of directors for the US/Mexico/Canada United Bid Committee in its (ultimately successful) bid to host the 2026 FIFA World Cup.

== See also ==
- Sunil Gulati — President of U.S. Soccer
