= Soccer United Marketing =

American soccer marketer

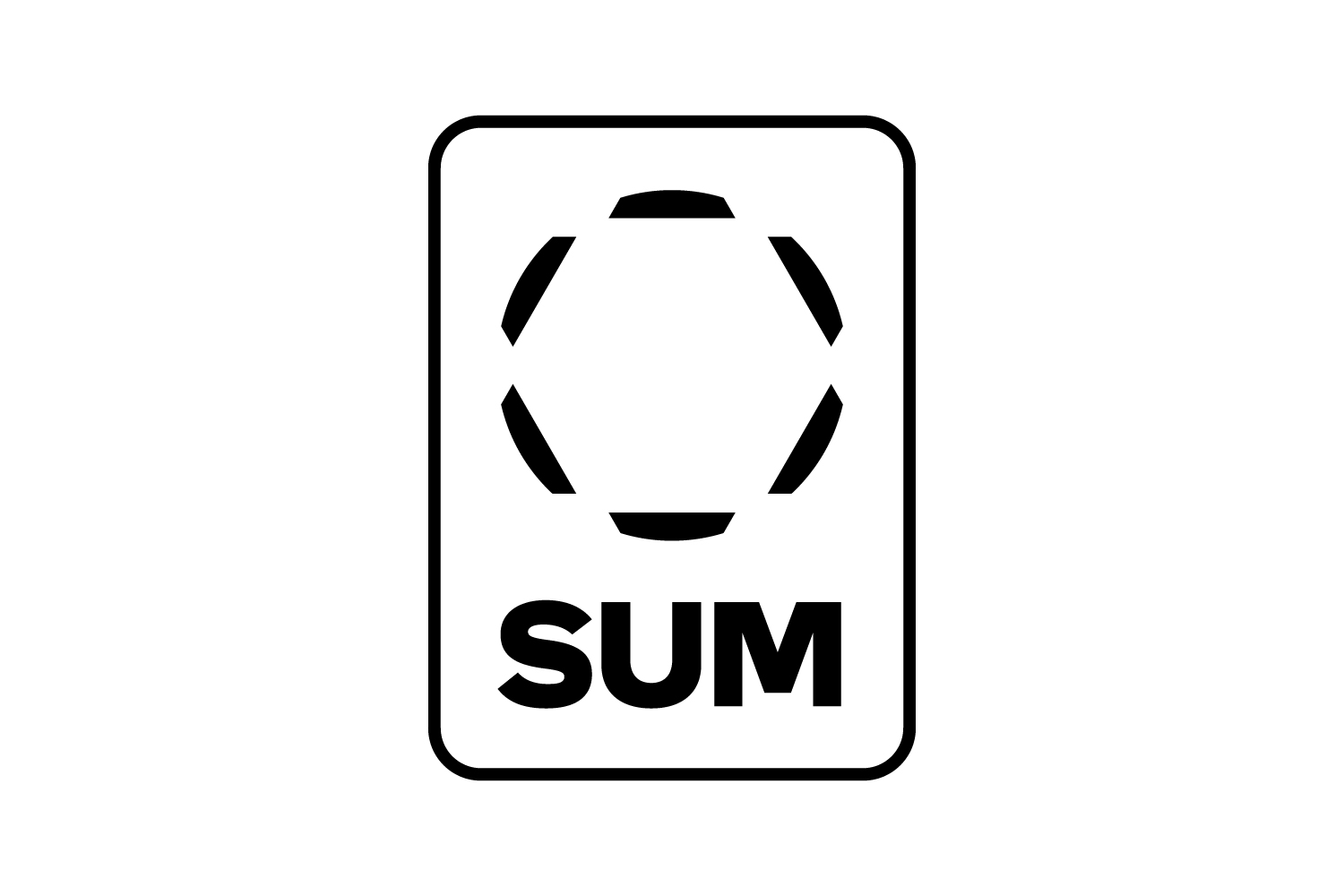
- Type: Private
- Industry: Advertising, marketing, sports
- Founded: 2002; 24 years ago
- Area served: North America
- Key people: Don Garber, Chief Executive Officer; Gary R. Stevenson, Deputy Commissioner and President; Camilo Durana, Executive Vice President; Radhika Duggal, Chief Marketing Officer
- Parent: Major League Soccer
- Website: Official website

Soccer United Marketing (SUM) is the for-profit marketing arm of Major League Soccer (MLS), which primarily deals with the commercialization, marketing, promotion and operational execution of professional soccer in the United States. The promotion also owns both the Mexican men's and women's national teams and their respective broadcast rights.

In 2016, SUM was also chosen as the exclusive worldwide marketing partner of CONCACAF and CONMEBOL, which included commercial rights to the Copa América Centenario, which was played in the United States that year. SUM also holds the commercial rights to MLS matches and Mexican men's and women's national team games played in the United States.

SUM has also assisted in the organization of several international soccer events with North American involvement, including the North American SuperLiga, the Pan-Pacific Championship, the CONCACAF Gold Cup, and the CONCACAF Nations League.

Since 2018, SUM has held the rights to the Campeones Cup, an annual cup between the MLS and Liga MX champions.

In 2023, SUM also launched the Leagues Cup, the first in-season club tournament in North America across all men's sports, pitting clubs from MLS and Liga MX.

== Affiliations with U.S. Soccer and its leadership ==
Soccer United Marketing is affiliated with the United States Soccer Federation. Regarding the relationship between Soccer United Marketing and United States Soccer Federation, Roger Pielke writes that the United States Soccer Federation "exempts from its conflict of interest policy 'any constituent or affiliated member entities of U.S. Soccer'", which includes Major League Soccer (MLS) and Soccer United Marketing.

Pielke writes, sourcing the New York Daily News, that this conflict of interest exemption allowed Sunil Gulati to become President of the United States Soccer Federation while also being a founder, board member, and deputy commissioner of MLS, and a member of Soccer United Marketing's board of directors.

Describing the relationship between MLS and the United States Soccer Federation, MLS Commissioner and Soccer United Marketing CEO Don Garber told Sports Illustrated, "Sunil and Dan (Flynn) had this view that as the governing body of the sport they would make commitments on the commercial side and on the competitive side to have MLS be the leader of the sport." He continued to say, "That's not something that exists in other parts of the world. I believe that Sunil could have made a different decision when he came in as president (in 2006) and had he made that decision MLS isn't be what it is today. Because we are joined at the hip."

Similarly describing the relationship between Soccer United Marketing and the United States Soccer Federation, USSF President Sunil Gulati said, "The growth of the game goes hand in hand with what the league has done over the last 16 years and the growth of so much of what's going on in U.S. Soccer. The working relationship between the two is extraordinary and my guess is there aren’t many in the world that are like that. We don’t have the sorts of conflicts you see between leagues and federations – that's a plus."

Soccer United Marketing and the United States Soccer Federation have played important roles in establishing MLS as the top professional closed-league system for soccer in America. MLS has this structure, as described by the Professional Council of the United States Soccer Federation as "a unique ownership and operating structure, based on a 'single entity' concept." The Professional Council goes on to explain that "MLS" 'single entity' structure allows investors to own an interest in the league, as well as individual teams."

In 2022, the U.S. Soccer Federation and Soccer United Marketing ended their commercial rights partnership. Despite the ending of the partnership, both organizations committed to continue working together.
