= 68th FIFA Congress =

2018 FIFA Congress

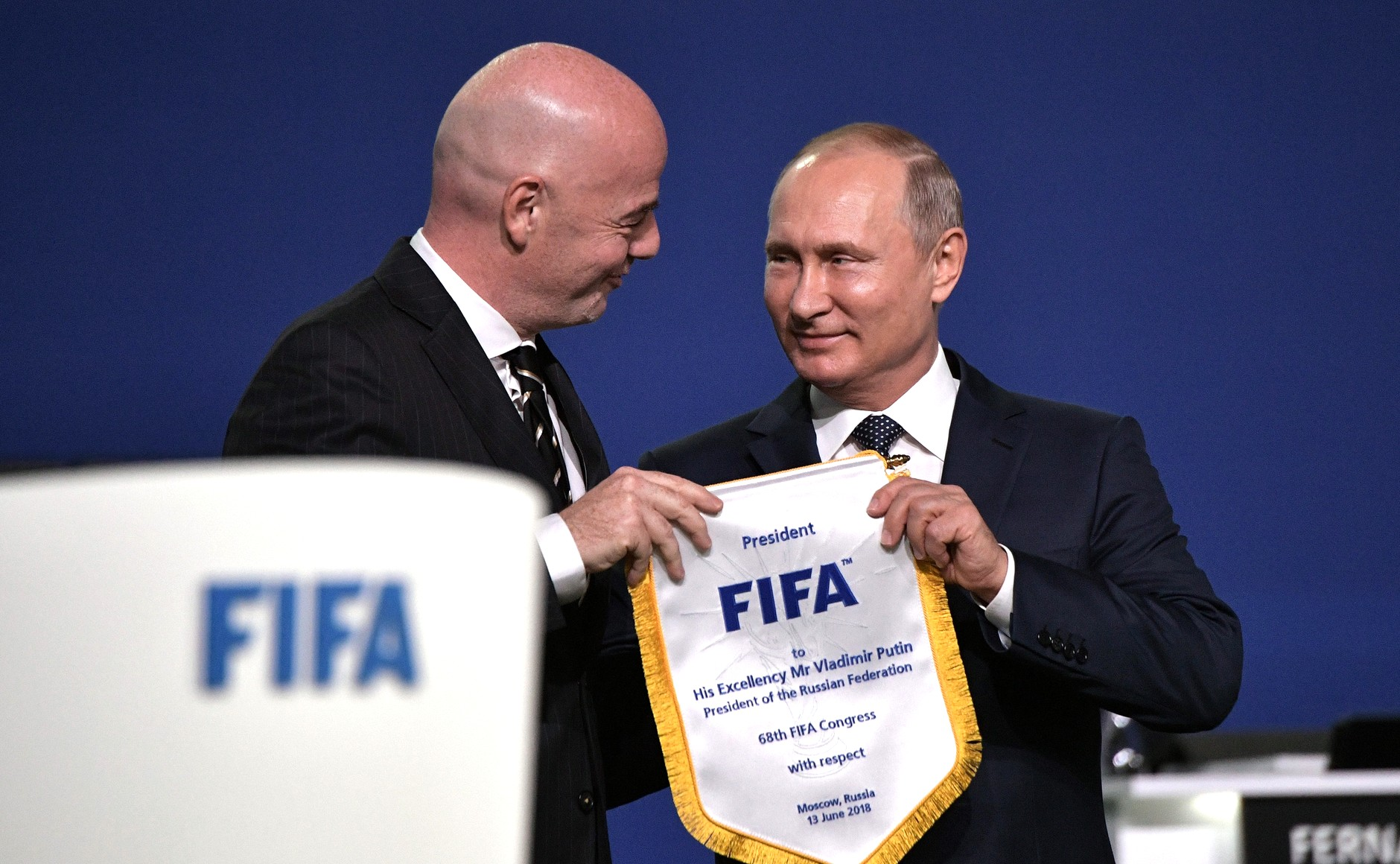
FIFA President Gianni Infantino with the president of Russia, Vladimir Putin, at the conference

The 68th FIFA Congress was held in Moscow, Russia, on 13 June 2018, prior to the 2018 FIFA World Cup.

== 2026 FIFA World Cup host ==
It was the first time since 1966 the FIFA World Cup Host was selected by the FIFA Congress. The bidding process was originally scheduled to start in 2015, with the appointment of hosts scheduled for the FIFA Congress on 10 May 2017 in Kuala Lumpur, Malaysia. On 10 June 2015, FIFA announced that the bid process for the 2026 FIFA World Cup was postponed. However, following the FIFA Council meeting on 10 May 2016, a new bid schedule was announced for May 2020 as the last in a four-phase process. The United bid (Canada/Mexico/United States) were awarded the 2026 World Cup with 134 votes over Morocco with 65 votes; None of the bids got a single vote from Iran.

Bids:

- Canada/Mexico/United States
- Morocco

2026 Results
Nation	Vote
Nation	Round 1
Canada/Mexico/United States	134
Morocco	65
None of the Bids	1
Total votes	200
