= Carlos Cordeiro =

American soccer administrator (born 1956)

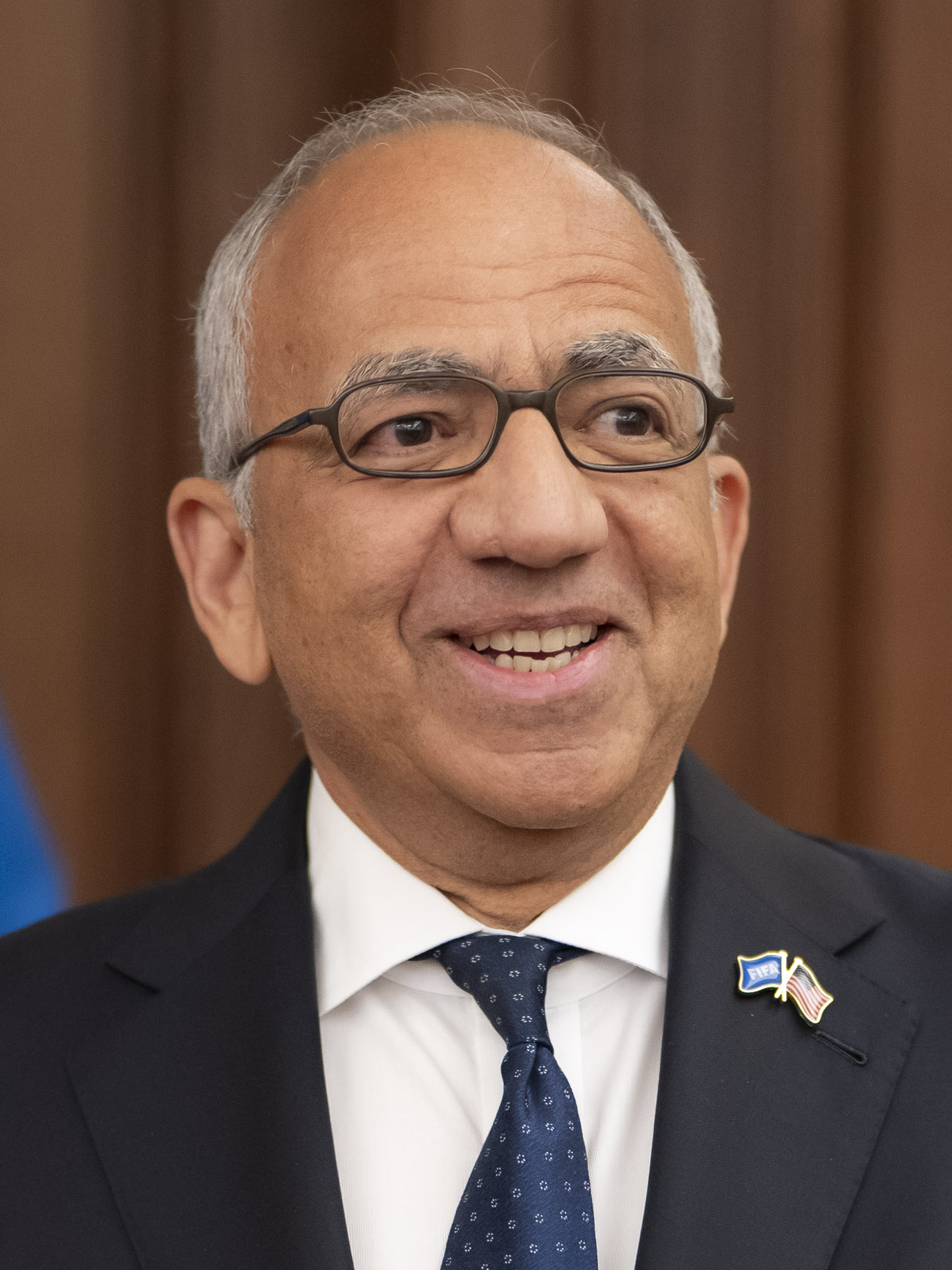

President of the United States Soccer Federation
- In office February 10, 2018 – March 12, 2020
- Preceded by: Sunil Gulati
- Succeeded by: Cindy Parlow Cone

Vice President of United States Soccer Federation
- In office 2016–2018

Personal details
- Born: 1956 (age 69–70) Bombay, Bombay State, India
- Education: Harvard University; Harvard Business School

Carlos Cordeiro (born 1956) is an American sports executive and retired investment banker. He was the senior advisor to the FIFA President, and had served as senior advisor to the White House Task Force on the FIFA World Cup 2026.

Previously he was the president of the United States Soccer Federation from February 10, 2018 until March 12, 2020 when he resigned after criticism over the official legal position taken by U.S. Soccer under his administration toward the U.S. women's national team. In 2021, he was appointed the Senior Advisor to FIFA for Global Strategy and Governance, and, later, the Senior Advisor to the FIFA President. In May 2025, Cordeiro was appointed by President Donald Trump to serve as the Senior Advisor to the White House Task Force on the FIFA World Cup 2026.

== Biography ==
Cordeiro was born to a Colombian mother and father of Luso-Indian descent in Bombay. He moved to Miami at the age of 15 and is a graduate of Harvard University, where he earned an AB and MBA. Prior to joining the USSF in 2007 as an independent director, Cordeiro was a partner at Goldman Sachs and an independent director at BHP.

Preceded by Sunil Gulati	President of the United States Soccer Federation (USSF); 2018–2020	Succeeded by Cindy Parlow Cone
