= Don Garber =

Major League Soccer commissioner

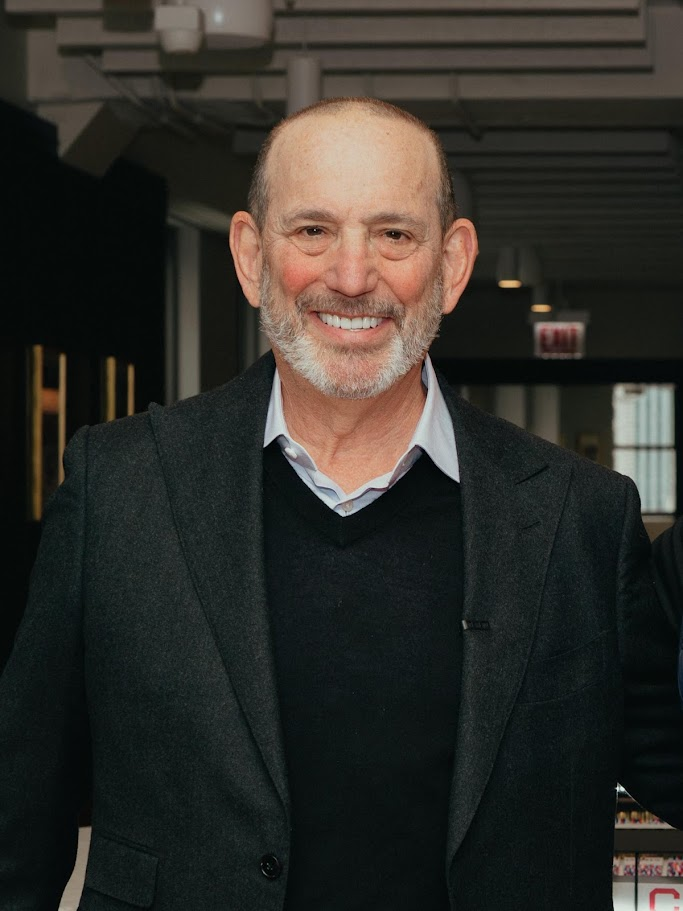
- Garber at Chicago Fire office in 2026

2nd Commissioner of Major League Soccer
- Incumbent
- Assumed office August 4, 1999
- Preceded by: Doug Logan

Personal details
- Born: October 9, 1957 (age 69) New York City, U.S.
- Education: State University of New York, Oneonta (BA)

Donald P. Garber (born October 9, 1957) is an American sports executive who has served as the commissioner of Major League Soccer (MLS) since 1999. Garber is also the CEO of Soccer United Marketing and a member of the United States Soccer Federation board of directors.

Garber has spent his career in the sports industry in roles related to marketing, events, television, and league administration. Before joining MLS, he worked for the National Football League for 16 years. During his tenure as commissioner, MLS expanded from 10 teams to 30.

== Early life ==
Garber grew up in a Jewish family in Queens, New York. His mother worked as a nursery school teacher and his father was an accountant.

== National Football League ==
Garber spent 16 years with the National Football League, finishing his tenure as senior vice president and managing director of NFL International, where he oversaw the league's business outside the United States, including the NFL Europe League.

He began his NFL career at NFL Properties in 1984 as a marketing manager and became the league's director of marketing in 1988. In 1992, he was appointed the NFL's senior vice president of business development and was responsible for television, special event, and marketing activities.Garber played a role in the growth and commercialization of major league events, including the Super Bowl. He contributed to efforts to secure high-profile performers for the halftime show, including Michael Jackson at Super Bowl XXVII (1993), helping establish the halftime show as a major entertainment property.

== MLS Commissioner ==
Garber was appointed commissioner of Major League Soccer on August 4, 1999, succeeding Doug Logan. Early in his tenure, MLS adopted several rule changes intended to align the league more closely with international standards, including the elimination of the shootout and the use of the referee's on-field timekeeping In 2004, MLS eliminated overtime and the three-plus-one substitution rule.

On December 7, 2001, Garber met with club owners at the Colorado ranch of Philip Anschutz to discuss plans intended to support the league's long-term viability. Among the concepts discussed were the development of soccer-specific stadiums, the creation of Soccer United Marketing, and securing broadcast rights to the 2002 and 2006 FIFA World Cups.

Soccer United Marketing (SUM) was established in 2002 and manages sponsorship, licensing, and advertising sales for MLS and other soccer properties in North America. The entity was created during a period when media rights and sponsorship values for professional soccer in the United States were limited, with the goal of centralizing commercial operations and increasing the sport’s visibility and commercial viability. SUM acquired the English-language rights to the 2002 and 2006 FIFA World Cups for broadcast in the United States. In 2016, CONCACAF selected SUM to market and service its worldwide sponsorship rights.

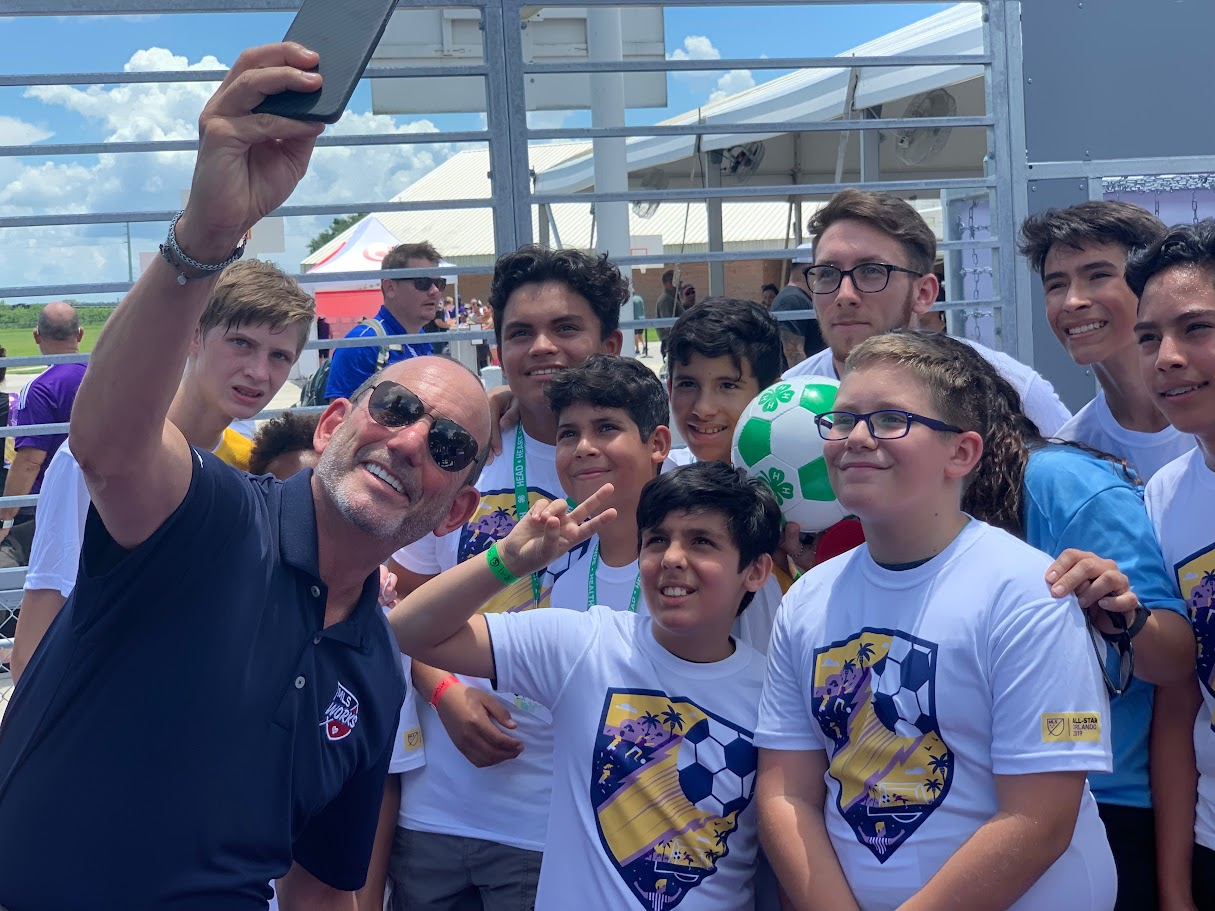
Don Garber taking a selfie with fans at the MLS All-Star Game in 2019

Before Garber became commissioner, only the Columbus Crew played in a stadium built specifically for MLS. MLS clubs increasingly moved into soccer-specific stadiums during his tenure. One of the earliest was the Home Depot Center (now Dignity Health Sports Park), built in 2003 to host the Los Angeles Galaxy and U.S. national teams. Additional stadiums were developed in subsequent years as the league expanded. In 2026, Inter Miami CF will open Miami Freedom Park, with New York City FC and Chicago Fire FC opening new stadiums in the years to come.

Major League Soccer expanded from 10 clubs in 2004 to 30 clubs in 2025.Expansion fees increased significantly during that period. Toronto FC paid a reported $10 million expansion fee in 2006, while San Diego FC's expansion fee in 2023 was reported at $500 million. When Forbes first released valuations of MLS clubs in 2008, the average team value was $48 million. By 2025, Sportico reported that multiple MLS clubs had valuations exceeding $1 billion.

MLS adopted the Designated Player Rule following the 2006 season, allowing clubs to sign a limited number of players whose compensation exceeds the league's salary budget charge. The rule enabled clubs to sign players such as David Beckham with the LA Galaxy and Lionel Messi with Inter Miami CF.

MLS media rights agreements expanded during Garber's tenure. In 2014, ESPN, Fox, and Univision acquired English- and Spanish-language rights to MLS and U.S. Soccer matches in a deal worth about $90 million annually. MLS also entered into international broadcast agreements and digital streaming partnerships, including a streaming deal with Facebook and Univision in 2017. In 2023, MLS began a ten-year partnership with Apple, worth $2.5 billion, that included the launch of MLS Season Pass. In 2024, Major League Soccer announced the launch of the MLS Innovation Lab, a program intended to support sports technology companies. The initiative provides selected startups with opportunities to test products in real-world environments across the MLS ecosystem.

Under Garber, MLS launched MLS NEXT in 2020 and MLS NEXT Pro in 2022 as part of its player-development structure. MLS NEXT is a youth platform in the United States and Canada, while MLS NEXT Pro is a professional men's league positioned between academy soccer and MLS first teams. In 2026, MLS NEXT included 318 clubs and more than 53,000 players, while MLS NEXT Pro had 30 clubs, including 27 MLS-affiliated teams and three independent teams. In April 2026, MLS and KKR announced the formation of Hometown Soccer Holdings to support MLS NEXT Pro.

== Honors ==
Garber was elected to the National Soccer Hall of Fame in 2016 and inducted in 2018.

In 2019, he was named Sports Business Journal Executive of the Year.

In 2023, he received the Werner Fricker Award, U.S. Soccer's highest honor for an individual.

In 2025, Garber was named by Sports Business Journal as one of the 125 most influential people in sports business over the last 25 years.

== Personal life ==
Garber serves on several professional and philanthropic boards. In 2018 he was appointed vice-chairman of the World Leagues Forum.
