= Wheelchair football (American) =

Sport for people with physical disabilities

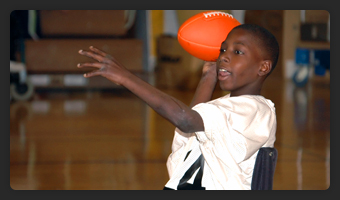
- Boy playing on an American Wheelchair Football team
- Highest governing body: American Association of Adapted Sports Programs; AAASP & USA Wheelchair Football League
- First played: Atlanta, Georgia, USA

Characteristics
- Contact: Contact
- Team members: 6 or more (6 at a time during game)
- Mixed-sex: Yes
- Type: Indoor
- Equipment: Football, manual wheelchair, and power wheelchair

Wheelchair football is a variation of gridiron football played in wheelchairs (both manual wheelchairs and power wheelchairs).

== History ==
The sport of wheelchair football was developed by Professor Tim Nugent in 1948. The sport of wheelchair football was developed for interscholastic competition (grades 1-12) by the American Association of Adapted Sports Programs (AAASP) of Atlanta, Georgia, USA, in 2005 to incorporate both the manual and power wheelchairs during game play. This was the first development and dissemination of training manuals/videos, and interscholastic policies and procedures for the sport and the first "league". Wheelchair football is patterned after American football, and is thus different from powerchair football or wheelchair soccer (both adaptations of association football).

A competitive wheelchair football league for adults, the USA Wheelchair Football League, was launched by Move United in 2020, and is open to adults with qualifying disabilities who play in a manual sport wheelchair.

=== American Association of Adapted Sports Programs (AAASP) ===
The sport follows adaptations of American football rules to suit athletes who use wheelchairs, with specific safety considerations and mobility accommodations. In the United Kingdom, a variant of the sport is governed by the British American Football Association (BAFA). This version is played with seven players per side on smaller indoor courts and includes rule adaptations for both manual and powered wheelchair users. The game emphasizes inclusivity, limits physical contact, and promotes tactical team play.

=== Interscholastic rules ===
The game of wheelchair football is played on a standard basketball court — 28 metres (92 ft) long by 15 metres (49 ft) wide. The required court markings are a center line and circle, and a key area measuring 8 metres (26 ft 3 in) wide by 1.75 metres (5 ft 9 in) deep at each end of the court. It can be played either indoors or outside, as long as it meets the standard requirements. All athletes must use either a manual or a power wheelchair when competing in the sport.

Specified rules for manual and power wheelchair users

Players using manual wheelchairs

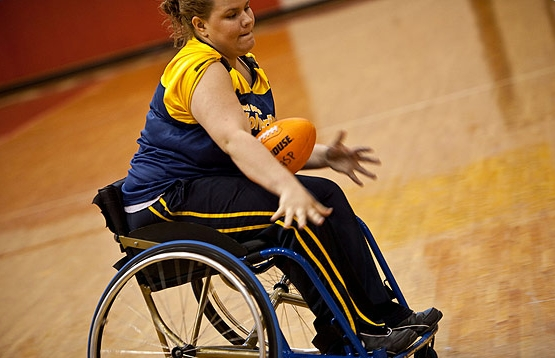

Players in manual chairs have successfully tackled an opponent when they tag the opponent with two hands on the body and above the knees.

Players using powerchair wheelchairs

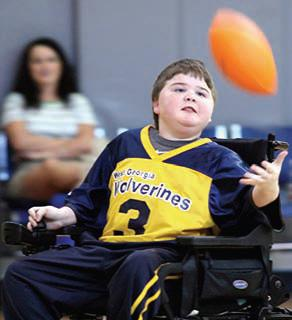

Players in power chairs will have a successful tackle when they tag the opponent with one hand on the opponent's body or chair.

AAASP interscholastic rules can be downloaded at the website.

A training video for coaches, including a breakdown of all rules, with motion graphics for potential plays, can also be viewed.

AAASP does not use a traditional disability sport classification system in any of its adaptEDsports in forming "legal" teams. It instead evaluates the overall functional ability and skill level of all players combined and assigns the team to either the varsity of junior varsity division of its league. This less-restrictive approach for forming legal teams has made the creation of local school-based teams and statewide league competition possible. For example, in 2024, AAASP had 14 interscholastic wheelchair football teams in Georgia.

Wheelchair football can be played indoors or outdoors on a hard surface such as a basketball court or on a standard turf field. The field dimensions for wheelchair football typically measure 60 yards in length and 25 yards in width, with end zones that are 8 yards deep. The field is divided into four 15-yard segments.

Teams are usually coeducational and consist of six players, though rosters may range from five to fourteen athletes depending on league regulations and field space. A standard-sized foam football is used to accommodate players of varying physical abilities.

Players are classified into three functional levels based on their physical capabilities:

- Level 1: Players with full use of their arms, hands, and vision.
- Level 2: Players with limited movement in their arms and/or hands, possibly accompanied by visual impairments.
- Level 3: Players with no arm movement and/or limited vision.

Scoring rules are adapted based on player classification. For Level 1 players, traditional methods such as kickoffs, punts, and passes are used. For Levels 2 and 3, points may be awarded for completed passes if the ball contacts the player's body between the hands and elbows, allowing inclusivity for those with limited mobility.

=== Classification ===
Wheelchair football players are classified into three different levels, and the rules of play are slightly different for each level.

- Level 1 players have full use of their arms, hands and eyes.
- Level 2 players have limited arm and/or hand movement and may have some type of visual impairment.
- Level 3 players have no arm-movement capability and/or have limited sight.

The rules for Level 1 players are somewhat similar to "touch football", where players touch rather than tackle their opponents. In that adapted game, the player - and not his or her chair - must be touched to count as a tackle. Players who have limited or no mobility in their arms use chair-to-chair contact for blocks and tackles.

=== Scoring ===
Level 1 players, kick offs, punts, runs, and goals are all scored using the hands. Level 2 and 3 players, points for pass completion are awarded if the ball hits the player in the area between the hands and their elbows.

Although the players cannot grab the football, they still need to maneuver their wheelchairs so they can be in the right position for the ball to hit the right place to score.

=== Team rules ===
A team has six attempts to score once they receive the ball. Teams may pass or "run" the ball into the end zone. Field goals, kick–offs and punts are thrown. A running game clock (no time–outs for incomplete passes, etc.) is used, as well as a play clock. Scoring is the same as in stand–up football, with one exception. A team that passes for the point–after–touchdown (PAT) will receive two points. Field goals are scored when the ball is thrown through the first two vertical uprights that support the hanging basket.

=== Basic rundown of the sport ===
Team	Number of players	Kick off	Offense	Play clock	Half time
Varsity teams	Six players per side	made from behind the goal line	4 downs to reach 1st marker or score	35 seconds	Two 30-minute halves running clock
Junior varsity teams	Six players per side	made from behind the first down marker	4 downs to reach 1st marker or score	45 seconds	Two 30-minute halves running clock

== USA Wheelchair Football League ==
The USA Wheelchair Football League plays on a field that is 60-yards long and 22-yards wide with an additional 8 yards at each end for end zones. The field can be indoor or outdoor, and shall be marked with lines every 15 yards crossing the length of the field, and a mark at the 3 yard line.

The game is played in four quarters of 15 minutes each with a running game clock and a 45-second play clock.

Tackling in the USA Wheelchair Football League is completed by placing one-hand above the waist of the ball carrier.

=== Player qualification ===
Players must be 18+ by August 1 of the season, and have a permanent physical disability which consistently reduces the function of the lower limbs to a degree where they cannot run, pivot, block or tackle, at the speed and with the control, safety, stability and endurance required to play running football as an able bodied player.

Players are classified via a functional classification system, and will receive a classification point ranging from 1–4.5. A team consists of seven players on the field. A team may not have more than 21 classification points at the field at one time.

== Athlete promotion ==
Wheelchair football is designed to accommodate athletes with a wide range of physical disabilities, including spinal cord injuries, amputations, and neurological conditions such as cerebral palsy. Athletes may use either manual or power wheelchairs, depending on their individual mobility needs and league rules. The sport emphasizes accessibility by modifying equipment and rules to allow participation from players with varying levels of upper-body function.

== Rules and gameplay ==
Games are usually played on a basketball court and use a foam football to reduce injury risk, particularly for players with limited grip or dexterity. Rule modifications account for wheelchair movement, emphasizing safety while preserving elements of speed, strategy, and physical skill.

== Development and promotion ==
In the United States, wheelchair football is supported by organizations such as Move United and the USA Wheelchair Football League (USAWFL), which organize events and promote the sport nationally. Local programs also help increase awareness and provide adaptive sport opportunities for individuals with disabilities. In addition to competition, wheelchair football fosters social inclusion, teamwork, and physical health benefits such as improved cardiovascular fitness and upper-body strength.

=== Scoring ===
Scoring in the USA Wheelchair Football League is available via the following methods:

Touchdown: 6 points

Point After Touchdown: 1 point (passing play), 2 points (running play)

Safety: 2 points

Note, a field goal is NOT a scoring option in the USA Wheelchair Football League

=== Required equipment ===
- Manual sport wheelchair
- Football (official NFL-size)
- Helmet (approved by NFL/NFLPA)

=== Coaches/Officials ===
Move United has a formal coaches and officials program which covers rules, concussion and safety protocol, setting up practice plans and official's roles and signals.

== See also ==
- Powerchair football
- Wheelchair soccer
