= USPSA =

USPSA may refer to:

- United States Practical Shooting Association
- United States Power Soccer Association
