= EPFA =

Sports governing body in Europe

The European Powerchair Football Association, commonly abbreviated to EPFA was established to govern the powerchair football in Europe. EPFA is a member organization of the Fédération Internationale de Powerchair Football Association (FIPFA).

The EPFA zone is the largest FIPFA Zone at present with seven member countries: Belgium, Denmark, Finland, England, France, Portugal, and Turkey.

EPFA is responsible for the following:

1. Identify each country and ensure their legitimacy.
2. Coordinate the specific Zone competitions.
3. Participate in the training and the development of the sport.
4. Follow the guidelines and the politics of Congress and of the FIPFA Executive Council.

== Executive committee ==
- EPFA Zone President: Ricky Stevenson (England)
- Sports Department: Nicolas Dubes (France)
- Development Commission: Herve Delattre (France)
- Administration and Financial: Rasmus Lond (Denmark)
