= United States Power Soccer Association =

The United States Power Soccer Association (USPSA) is the governing body of power soccer in the United States.

It was formally established in July 2006 as the US affiliate member of FIPFA. It was accepted as an affiliate member of the United States Soccer Federation on February 19, 2008.

== See also ==
- Powerchair Football
