= Abdullah Karim =

Senior career*
Years	Team	Apps	(Gls)
–2018	Wanderers		
2019	Sydney FC		
2020	Perth Glory		

International career
- Australia
- * Club domestic league appearances and goals

Abdullah Karim is an Australian powerchair football player who plays as a forward.

== Career ==
Karim represented Australia at the 2017 FIFPA World Cup, helping them achieve 4th place, their highest finish. He was Most Valuable Player at the 2017 FIFPA World Cup.
