= Hope Haven =

U.S. nonprofit organization

Hope Haven International is a 501(c)(3) charity organization based in Rock Valley, Iowa, that is best known for its United States and international distribution of refurbished wheelchairs for adults and children. The organization was founded in 1964 as a Christian charity to provide services to disabled persons in its community. Hope Haven collects, repairs, and distributes wheelchairs domestically and internationally, in addition to providing rehabilitation and vocational training. The organization relies upon volunteers and prison inmates to transport and refurbish the wheelchairs.

Hope Haven has been refurbishing, and providing shipment and trained personnel to fit wheelchairs, for physically disabled and poor Palestinian refugee children since 1998, with the political and logistical assistance of the Palestine Children's Relief Fund. The costs of wheelchairs is beyond the means of many families, and government funds are also not available, in many countries, such as Romania, served by Hope Haven with donations of wheelchairs and staff to properly fit the wheelchairs to users.
