= Everest and Jennings =

Manufacturer of mobility and adaptive equipment

Everest & Jennings
- Industry: Mobility equipment
- Founded: 1930s
- Headquarters: St. Louis, Missouri

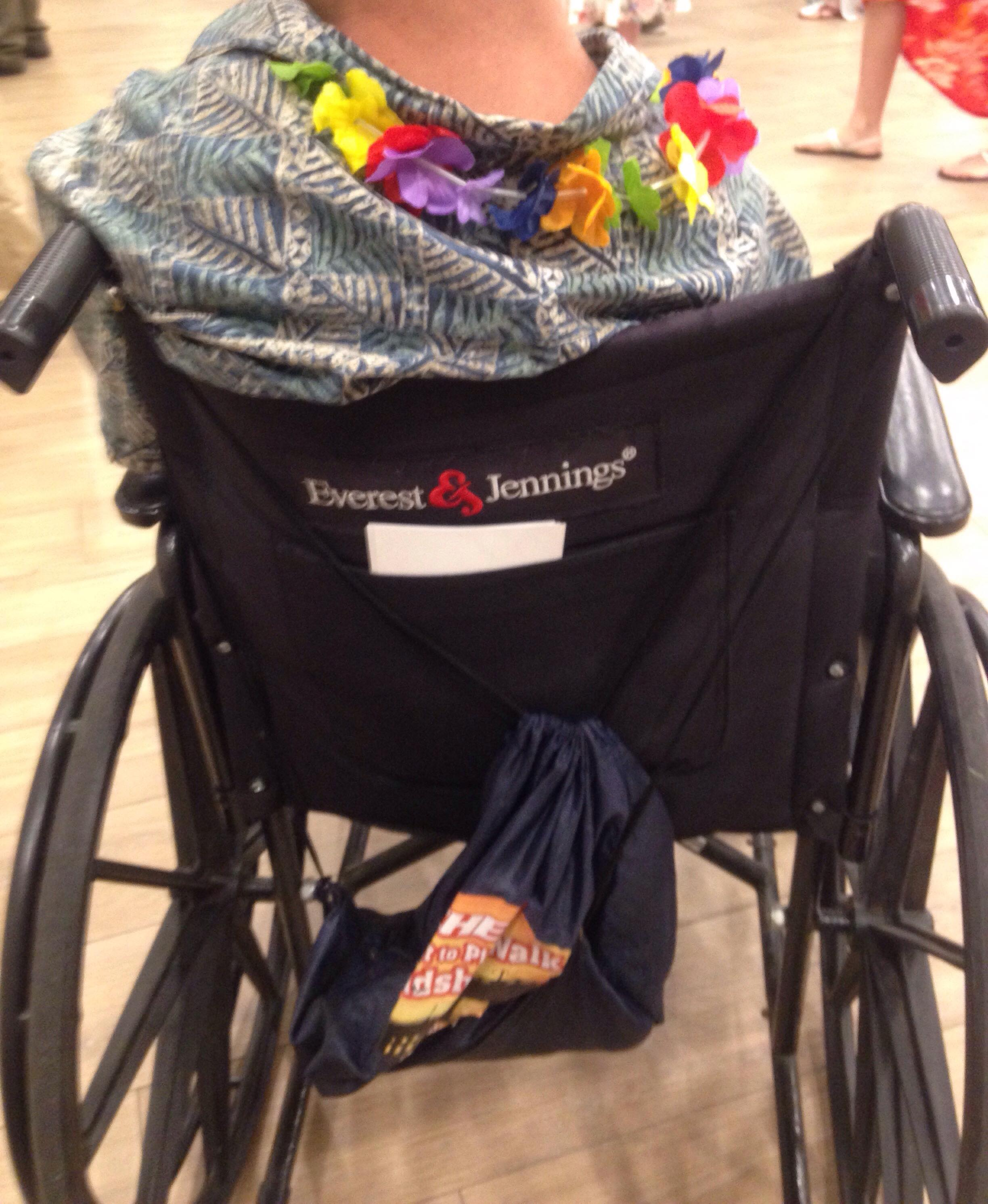
Everest & Jennings logo on the back of a wheelchair.

Everest & Jennings was a manufacturer of mobility and adaptive equipment. Everest & Jennings was the first company to mass-produce wheelchairs.

== Origins ==
Herbert A. Everest and Harry C. Jennings Sr. were friends, and both were engineers. Herbert Everest was also physically disabled after surviving a mining accident in 1918. Everest complained to Jennings about the bulk of chairs available in the early 1930s, and in 1933, the pair designed and built a lightweight, collapsible model in Jennings' garage. The design was patented in October 1937.

The pair soon went into business to manufacture their improved design. In the 1940s, they supplied disabled veterans of World War II through government contracts that established the company as a recognized name in rehabilitation equipment.

The Everest family sold its interest in the company in 1943, but Gerald Jennings, son of Harry Sr., was chief executive from 1952 until he retired in 1985.

In 1956, the company was "the first to manufacture the electric wheelchair on a mass scale".

== Success and legal troubles ==
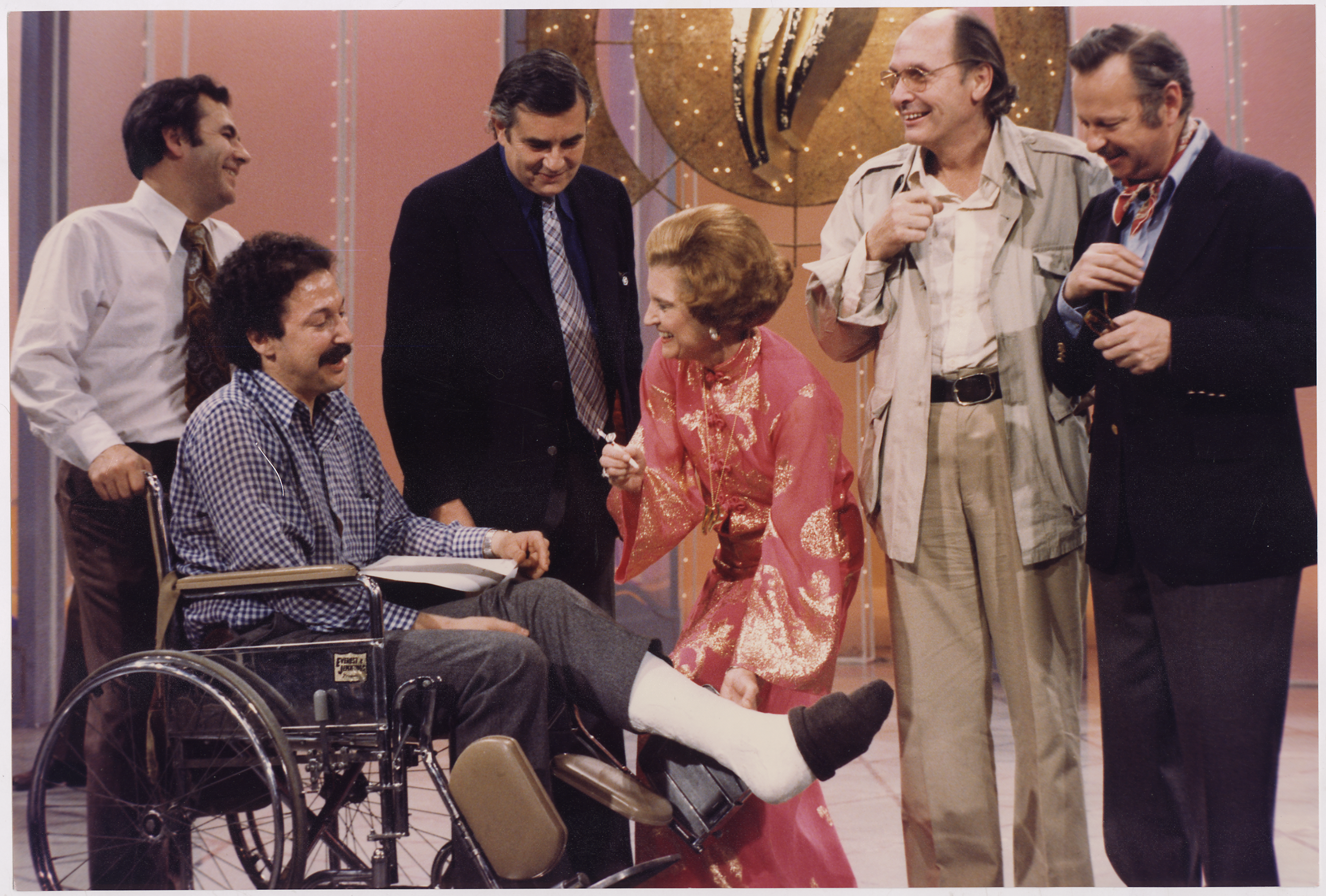
Photograph of First Lady Betty Ford Signing the Cast of a Television Crew Member, Following the Taping of the 1976... - NARA - 186827; the wheelchair's Everest & Jennings logo is visible under the armrest

By the early 1970s, Everest & Jennings International was "the world's largest supplier of wheelchairs." But this status brought increased scrutiny. In 1977, the United States Justice Department formally accused Everest & Jennings of practices that violated antitrust laws. The resulting settlement required Everest & Jennings to make annual compliance reports to the Justice Department; the settlement was called "little more than a slap on the wrist" by consumer advocate Ralph Nader. Nader was also involved with protests about the quality, safety, and price of Everest & Jennings chairs, by a disability rights group. A class action suit was brought by equipment dealers, but dismissed in court in 1984.

Everest & Jennings recorded sales of $145 million in 1980, and profits near $8 million. In the 1980s they launched "Avenues," an adaptive clothing line for wheelchair users. They also diversified into hospital beds, but it suffered major losses. Changes within the company and in the business landscape during the 1980s left Everest & Jennings struggling at decade's end.

== Later developments ==
In 1992, facing financial difficulties from lost market share, Everest & Jennings moved from Camarillo, California to St. Louis, Missouri. In 1993, the company acquired Medical Composite Technology, a carbon fiber technology company.

In 1996, still struggling with debt and falling sales, Everest & Jennings announced the sale of the company to Graham-Field Health Products. Graham-Field soon closed the Everest & Jennings plant in Earth City, Missouri. Graham-Field continues to market wheelchairs under the Everest & Jennings name.

== Notable customers ==
Among the prominent early users of Everest & Jennings wheelchairs were Franklin Delano Roosevelt, Sergeant Alvin C. York and Winston Churchill. Ed Roberts and other members of the Rolling Quads used Everest & Jennings power chairs. Author Joni Eareckson Tada once wrote, "If they ever made a statue of me, I would want my 300-pound Everest & Jennings power chair front and center." Actor Christopher Reeve's first wheelchair after becoming quadriplegic in 1995 was made by Everest & Jennings.
