= Wheelchair soccer =

Sport for people with physical disabilities

Wheelchair soccer is a variation of association football, in which all of the participants are wheelchairs users due to physical disability. Intellectual disabilities can also be a factor, but this is not always the case. The wheelchairs can be either motorised, or manually pushed.

In case of all electric and some manual wheelchairs, the player propels themselves where possible. If this is not physically possible, the player is allowed to use a 'pusher' to move them around the court, but the pusher is passive in the sense that they cannot become physically involved in the game. Wheelchair soccer is similar to the able-bodied form of the game in terms of rules and structure, the only real difference being that the player uses their wheelchair to move around the court and also to propel the ball when passing, to tackle another player (in defense), and to score goals. If a player is physically able to kick the ball, then they are allowed to do so. Also, if the goalkeeper is able to stop the ball with their hands, they are allowed to do so.

In most cases, there is both a seniors and reserves division. In reserves, there are no goalkeepers. This format caters for the players who are more severely physically disabled than others. The reserves division can also be for players who are beginners. Many players later make the transition to the seniors division.

Difficulties can arise in the playing of the game due to the vast differences in the physical abilities of the players. The only thing that is common to all players is that they have a physical disability and are wheelchair users. This means that players who kick the ball are usually more powerful and accurate than those who cannot. In response, some players who use electric wheelchairs attach a flat metal or wooden panel to the front of their foot plates. This measure both prevents the ball on sliding underneath the chair during play (a common problem), and also gives the player a flat surface when making contact with the ball. This increases passing and potential goalscoring accuracy.

In the senior division, rules also state that the attacking player is not allowed go into the semicircular area inhabited by the goalkeeper and all the shots on goal must be taken from outside the semicircle. This is 'the last line of defence'.

The games are played indoors (usually on a modified basketball court). The ball is also slightly larger than a regulation-sized soccer ball.

Wheelchair soccer was invented in Victoria, Australia, where it is developed as a partnership between Scope (Vic Ltd) and the Football Victoria. Wheelchair soccer is split up into two regions, Southeast and Northwest, both with reserves and senior divisions. The top team in each regional division meets up for the State Final.

The participants use a mix of manual, and electric wheelchairs. While it may not be the only sport that is available for people in electric wheelchairs, it is the most prominent. The above league in Victoria consists of amateur participants.
