= Wheelchair =

Chair with wheels used by people with mobility deficiencies

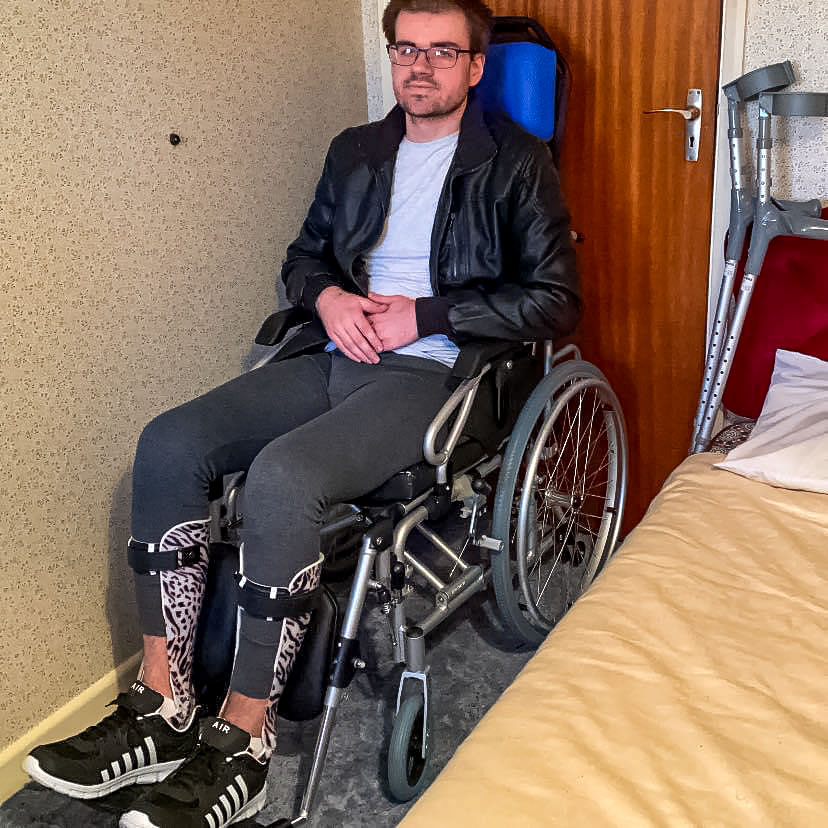
A disabled man sitting in a wheelchair

A wheelchair is a mobilized form of chair using two or more wheels, a footrest, and an armrest usually cushioned. It is used when walking is difficult or impossible due to illnesses, injury, disabilities, or age-related health conditions. Wheelchairs provide mobility, postural support, and greater independence for people who cannot walk or who have difficulty walking, enabling them to move around, participate in everyday activities, and live life on their own terms.

Wheelchairs come in a wide variety of formats to meet the specific needs of their users. They may include specialized seating adaptions, and individualized controls, and may be specific to particular activities, as with sports wheelchairs and beach wheelchairs. The most widely recognized distinction is between motorized wheelchairs, where propulsion is provided by batteries and electric motors, and manual wheelchairs, where the propulsive force is provided either by the wheelchair user or occupant pushing the wheelchair by hand (self-propelled), by someone else pushing from the rear using the handles, or pushing from the side using a handle attachment.

== History ==
The Sanskrit grammarian Pāṇini (circa 5th century BCE India) mentions the Sanskrit word parpafor wheelchair in his Aṣṭādhyāyī 4.4.10.

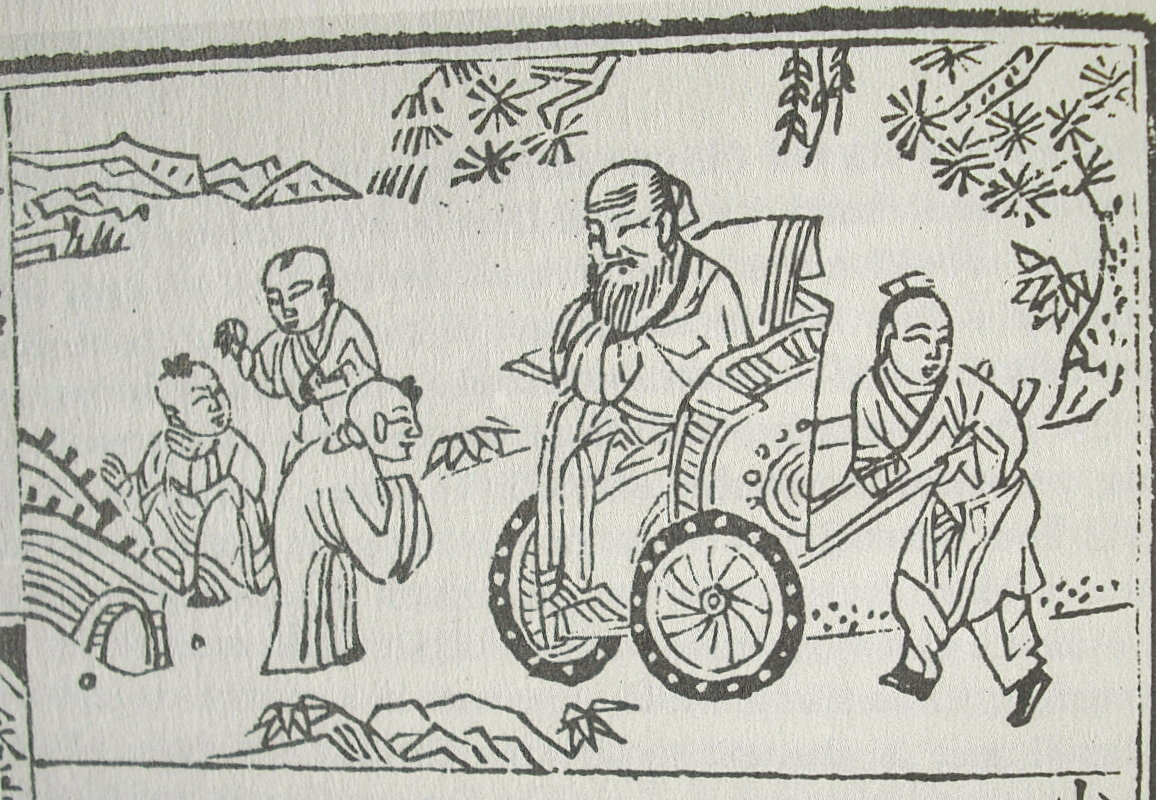
Depiction of Chinese philosopher Confucius in a wheelchair, dating to c. 1680

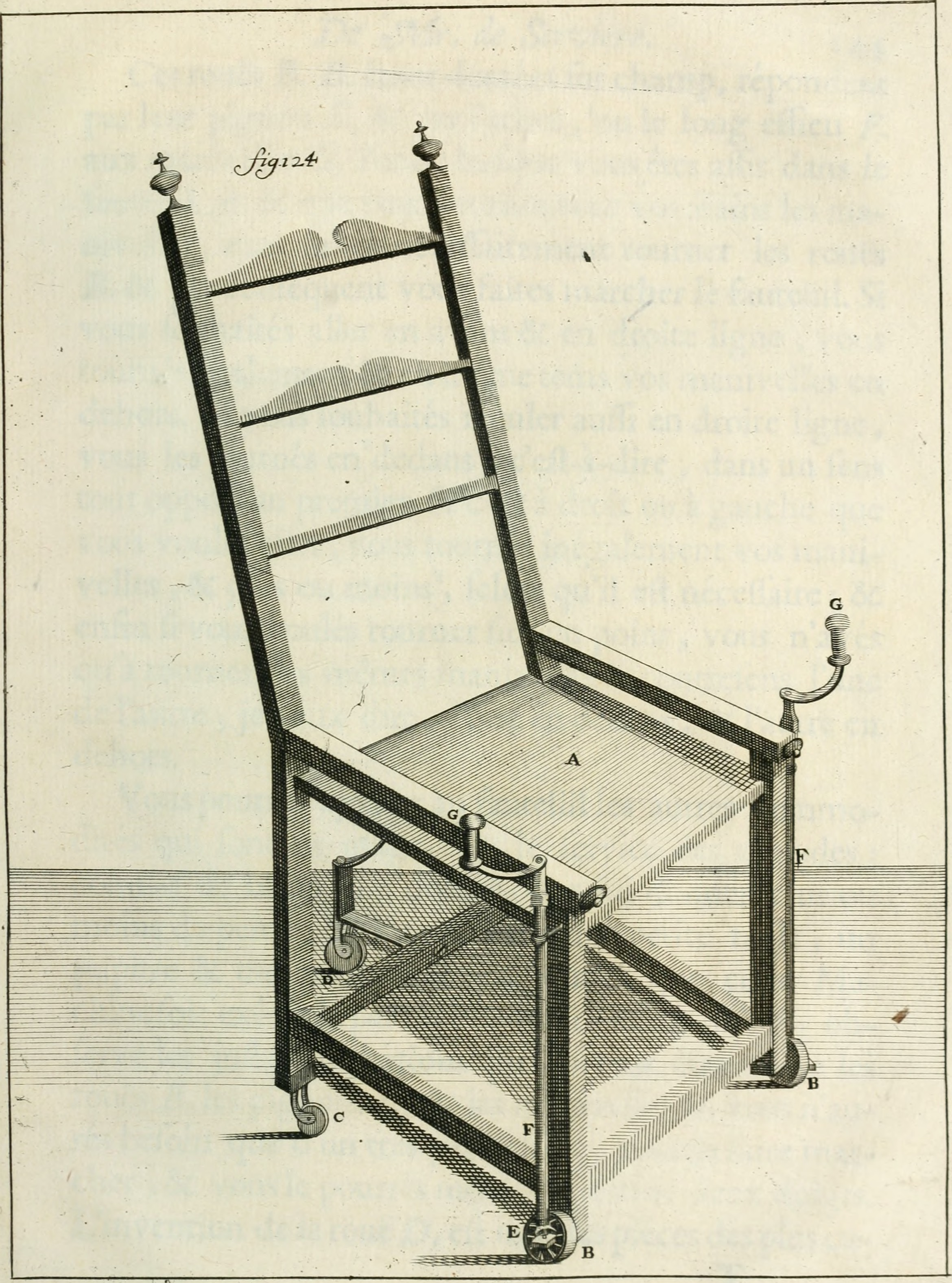
Nicolas Grollier de Servière (1596–1689) wheelchair in his Cabinet of curiosities

The earliest records of wheeled furniture are an inscription found on a stone slate in China and a child's bed depicted in a frieze on a Greek vase, both dating between the 6th and 5th century BCE. The first records of wheeled seats being used for transporting disabled people date to three centuries later in China; the Chinese used early wheelbarrows to move people as well as heavy objects. A distinction between the two functions was not made for another several hundred years, until around CE 525, when images of wheeled chairs made specifically to carry people began to occur in Chinese art.

Although Europeans eventually developed a similar design, this method of transportation did not exist until 1595 when an unknown inventor from Spain built one for King Phillip II. Although it was an elaborate chair having both armrests and leg rests, the design still had shortcomings since it did not feature an efficient propulsion mechanism and thus required assistance to propel it. This made the design more comparable to a modern-day highchair or portable throne for the wealthy than to a modern-day wheelchair for disabled people.

In 1655, Stephan Farffler, a 22-year-old paraplegic watchmaker, built the world's first self-propelling chair on a three-wheel chassis using a system of cranks and cogwheels. However, the device resembled a handcycle more than a wheelchair since the design included hand cranks mounted at the front wheel.

A self-propelled wheelchair was made for the Parliamentarian commander-in-chief Sir Thomas Fairfax due to the many injuries he had received during the English Civil War, and he used it during the final years of his life. The wheelchair of Thomas Fairfax is currently on display at the National Civil War Centre in Newark-on-Trent.

The invalid carriage or Bath chair brought the technology into more common use from around 1760.

In 1887, wheelchairs ("rolling chairs") were introduced to Atlantic City so invalid tourists could rent them to enjoy the Boardwalk. Soon, many healthy tourists also rented the decorated "rolling chairs" and servants to push them as a show of decadence and treatment they could never experience at home.

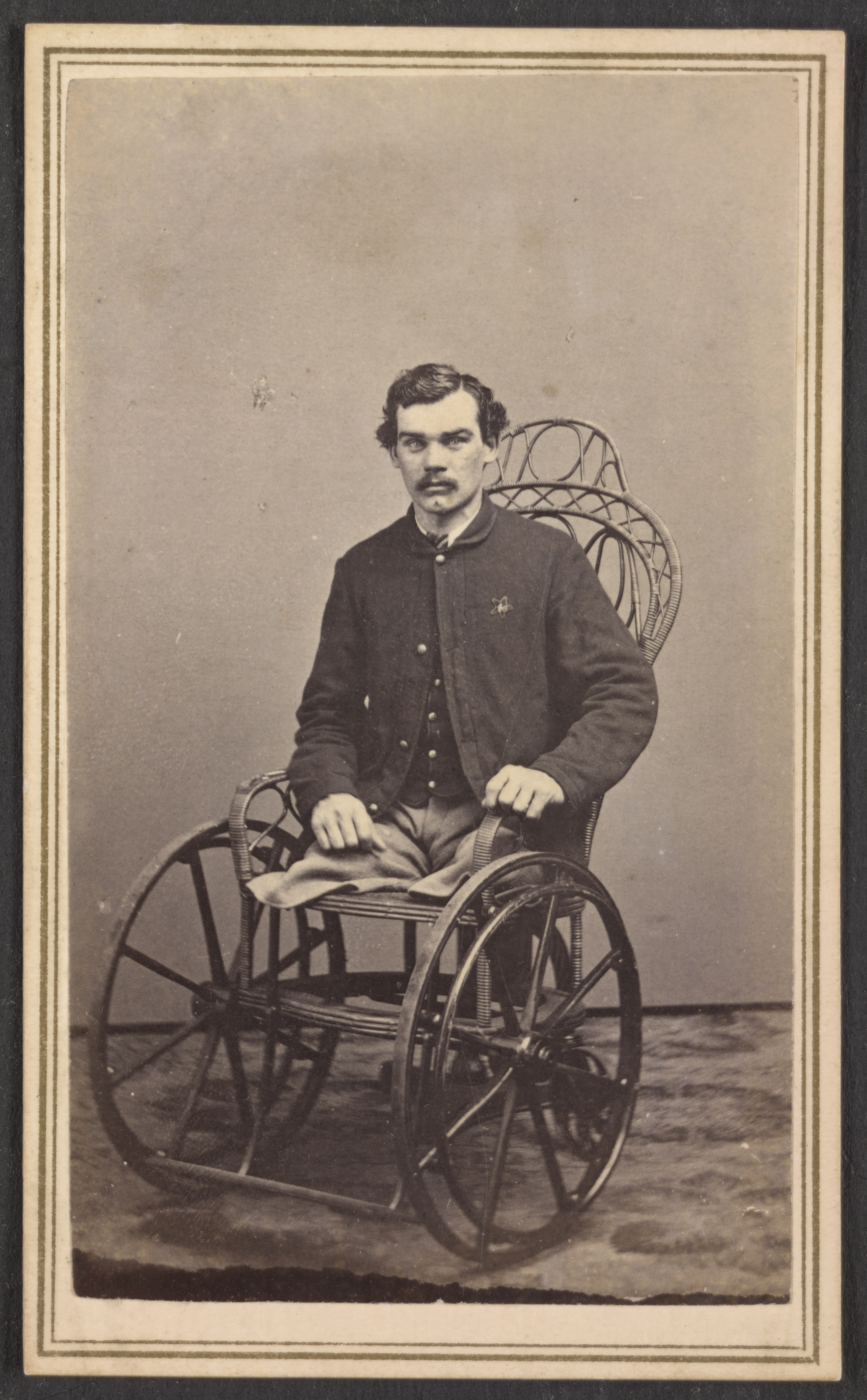
Amputee in a 19th-century wheelchair

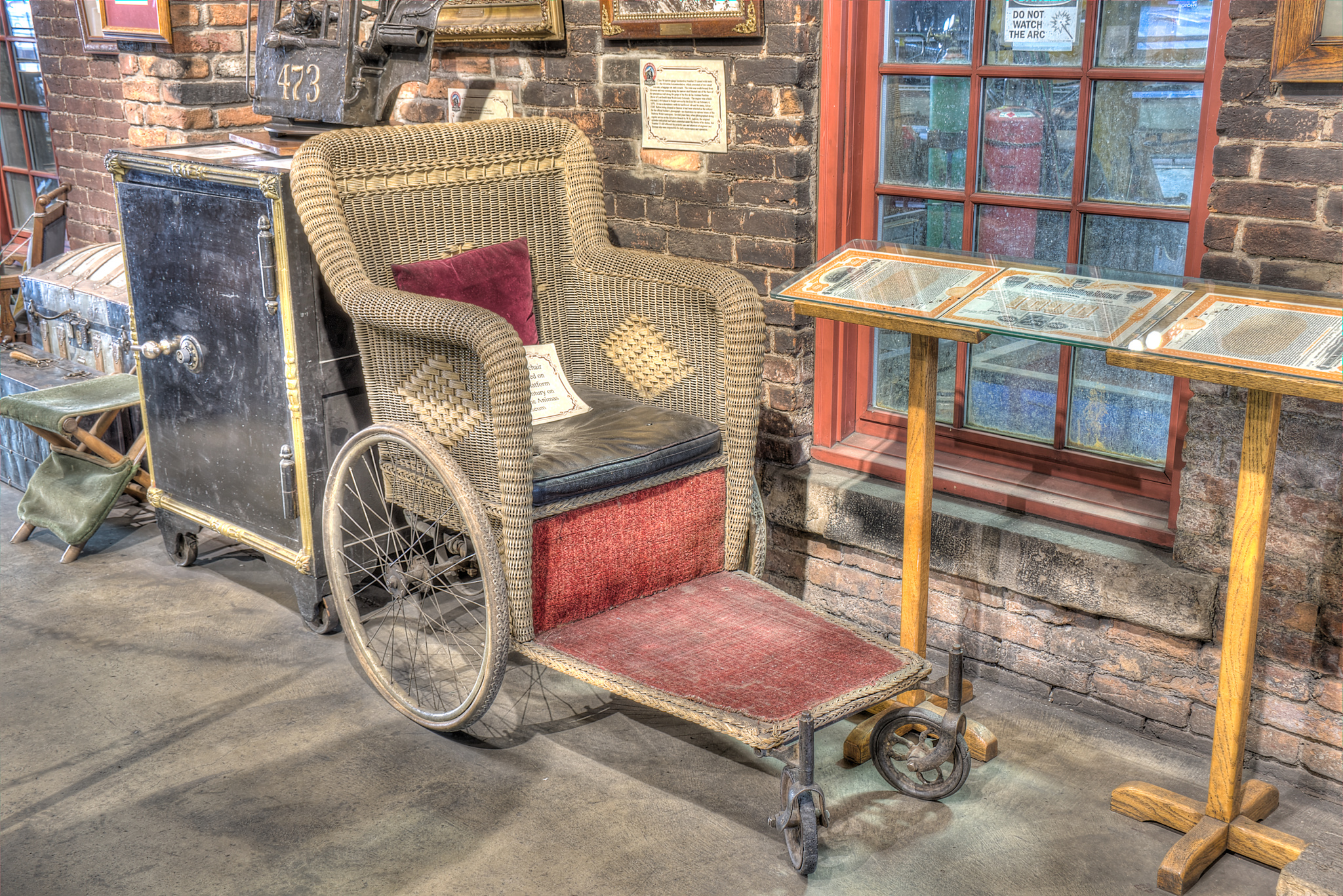
Another 19th century wheelchair

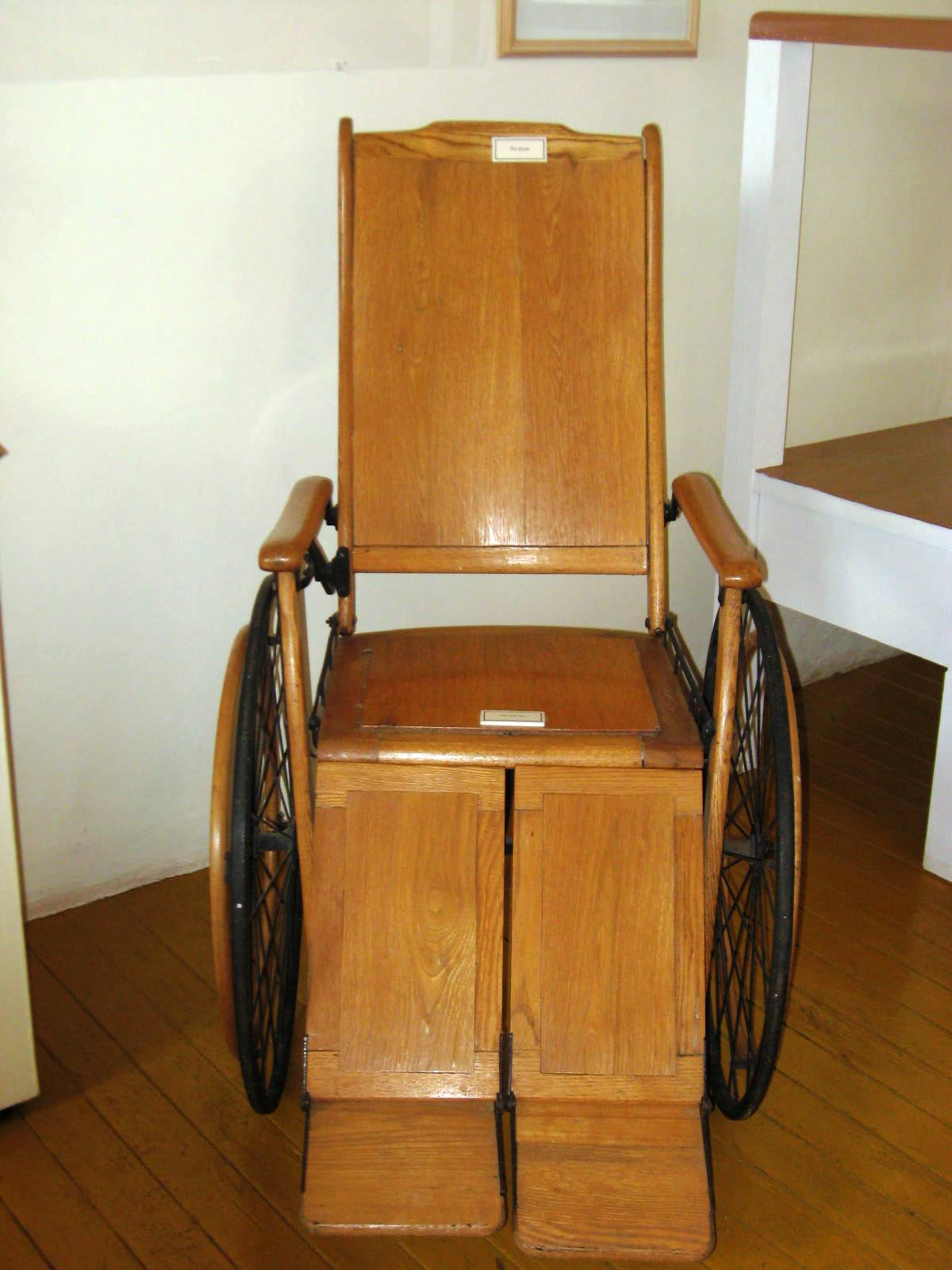
Wooden wheelchair dating to the early part of the 20th century

=== Modern wheelchairs ===
In 1933 Harry C. Jennings Sr. and his disabled friend Herbert Everest, both mechanical engineers, invented the first lightweight, steel, folding, portable wheelchair. Everest had previously broken his back in a mining accident. Everest and Jennings saw the business potential of the invention and went on to become the first mass-market manufacturer of wheelchairs. Their "X-brace" design is still in common use, albeit with updated materials and other improvements. The X-brace idea came to Jennings from the men's folding "camp chairs/stools", rotated 90 degrees, used in the outdoors and at the mines.

== Types ==
There are a wide variety of types of wheelchairs, differing by propulsion method, mechanisms of control, and technology used. Some wheelchairs are designed for general everyday use, others for single activities, or to address specific access needs. Innovation within the wheelchair industry is relatively common, but many innovations ultimately fall by the wayside, either from over-specialization or from failing to come to market at an accessible price point. The iBOT is perhaps the best-known example of this in recent years.

=== Manual self-propelled wheelchairs ===
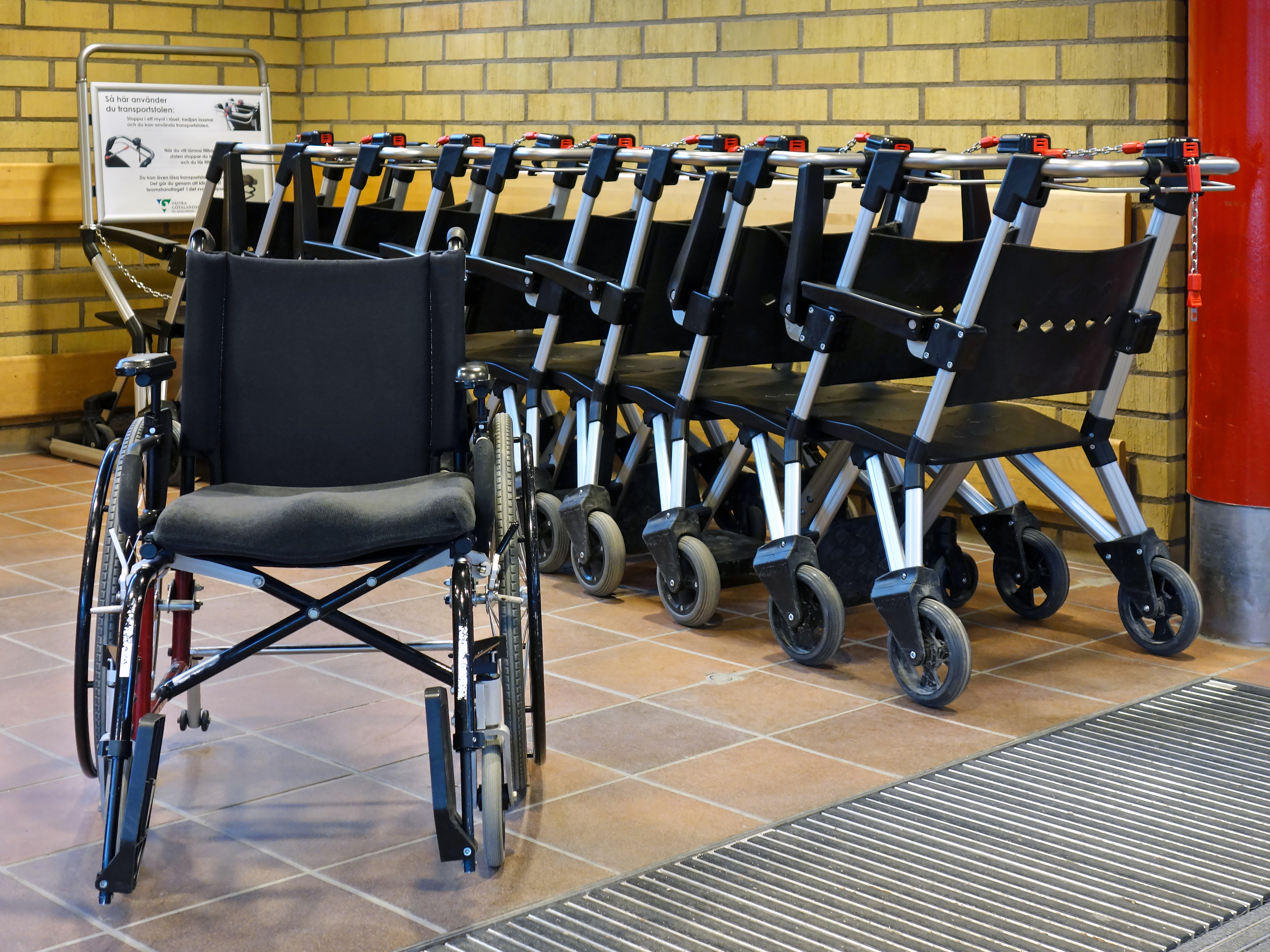
Folding chair and stackable rigid chairs for visitors in NÄL hospital, Sweden

A self-propelled manual wheelchair incorporates a frame, seat, one or two footplates (footrests), and four wheels: usually two caster wheels at the front and two large wheels at the back. A separate seat cushion is also generally provided. The larger rear wheels usually have push-rims of slightly smaller diameter projecting just beyond the tyre; these allow the user to manoeuvre the chair by pushing on them without requiring them to grasp the tyres. Manual wheelchairs generally have brakes that bear on the tyres of the rear wheels; however, these are solely parking brakes and in-motion braking is provided by the user's palms bearing directly on the push-rims. As this causes friction and heat build-up, particularly on long downslopes, many wheelchair users will choose to wear padded wheelchair gloves. Manual wheelchairs often have two push handles at the upper rear of the frame to allow for manual propulsion by a second person; however, many active wheelchair users will remove these to prevent unwanted pushing from people who believe they are being helpful.

Everyday manual wheelchairs come in two major varieties, folding or rigid. Folding chairs are generally low-end designs, whose predominant advantage is being able to fold, generally by bringing the two sides together. This is an advantage for people who need to store the wheelchair frequently or to put it in a small vehicle. Rigid wheelchairs have permanently welded joints and many fewer moving parts. This reduces the energy required to push the chair by eliminating many points where the chair would flex and absorb energy as it moves. Welded rather than folding joints also reduce the overall weight of the chair. Rigid chairs typically feature instant-release rear wheels and backrests that fold down flat, allowing the user to dismantle the chair quickly for storage in a car. A few wheelchairs attempt to combine the features of both designs by providing a fold-to-rigid mechanism in which the joints are mechanically locked when the wheelchair is in use.

Many rigid models are made with light materials such as aluminium and titanium, and wheelchairs of composite materials such as carbon-fibre have started to appear. Ultra lightweight rigid wheelchairs are commonly known as 'active user chairs' as they are ideally suited to independent use. Another innovation in rigid chair design is the installation of shock absorbers, such as "Frog Legs", which cushion the bumps over which the chair rolls. These shock absorbers may be added to the front wheels, to the rear wheels, or both. Rigid chairs also have the option for their rear wheels to have a camber, or tilt, which angles the tops of the wheels in toward the chair. This allows for more mechanically efficient propulsion by the user and also makes it easier to hold a straight line while moving across a slope. Sport wheelchairs often have large camber angles to improve stability.

Rigid-framed chairs are generally made to measure, to suit both the specific size of the user and their needs and preferences around areas such as the "tippyness" of the chair – determined by the distance between the center of gravity and the rear axle. Experienced users with sufficient upper-body strength can generally balance the chair on its rear wheels, a "wheelie", and the "tippyness" of the chair controls the ease with which this can be initiated. The wheelie allows a wheelchair user to climb and descend curbs and move more easily over small obstacles and irregular ground such as cobbles.

The rear wheels of self-propelled wheelchairs typically range from 20–24 in (510–610 mm) in diameter, and commonly resemble bicycle wheels. Wheels are rubber-tired and may be solid, pneumatic or gel-filled. The wheels of folding chairs may be permanently attached, but those for rigid chairs are commonly fitted with quick-release axles activated by depressing a button at the centre of the wheel.

All major varieties of wheelchairs can be highly customized for the user's needs. Such customization may encompass the seat dimensions, height, seat angle, footplates, leg rests, front caster outriggers, adjustable backrests and controls. Various optional accessories are available, such as anti-tip bars or wheels, safety belts, adjustable backrests, tilt and/or recline features, extra support for limbs or head and neck, holders for crutches, walkers or oxygen tanks, drink holders, and mud and wheel-guards as clothing protectors.

Light weight and high costs are related to the manual wheelchair market. At the low-cost end, heavy, folding steel chairs with sling seats and little adaptability dominate. Users may be temporarily disabled, or using such a chair as a loaner, or simply unable to afford better. These chairs are common as "loaners" at large facilities such as airports, amusement parks and shopping centers. A slightly higher price band sees the same folding design produced in aluminium. The high end of the market contains ultra-light models, extensive seating options and accessories, all-terrain features, and so forth. The most expensive manual chairs may rival the cost of a small car.

=== Manual attendant-propelled wheelchairs ===
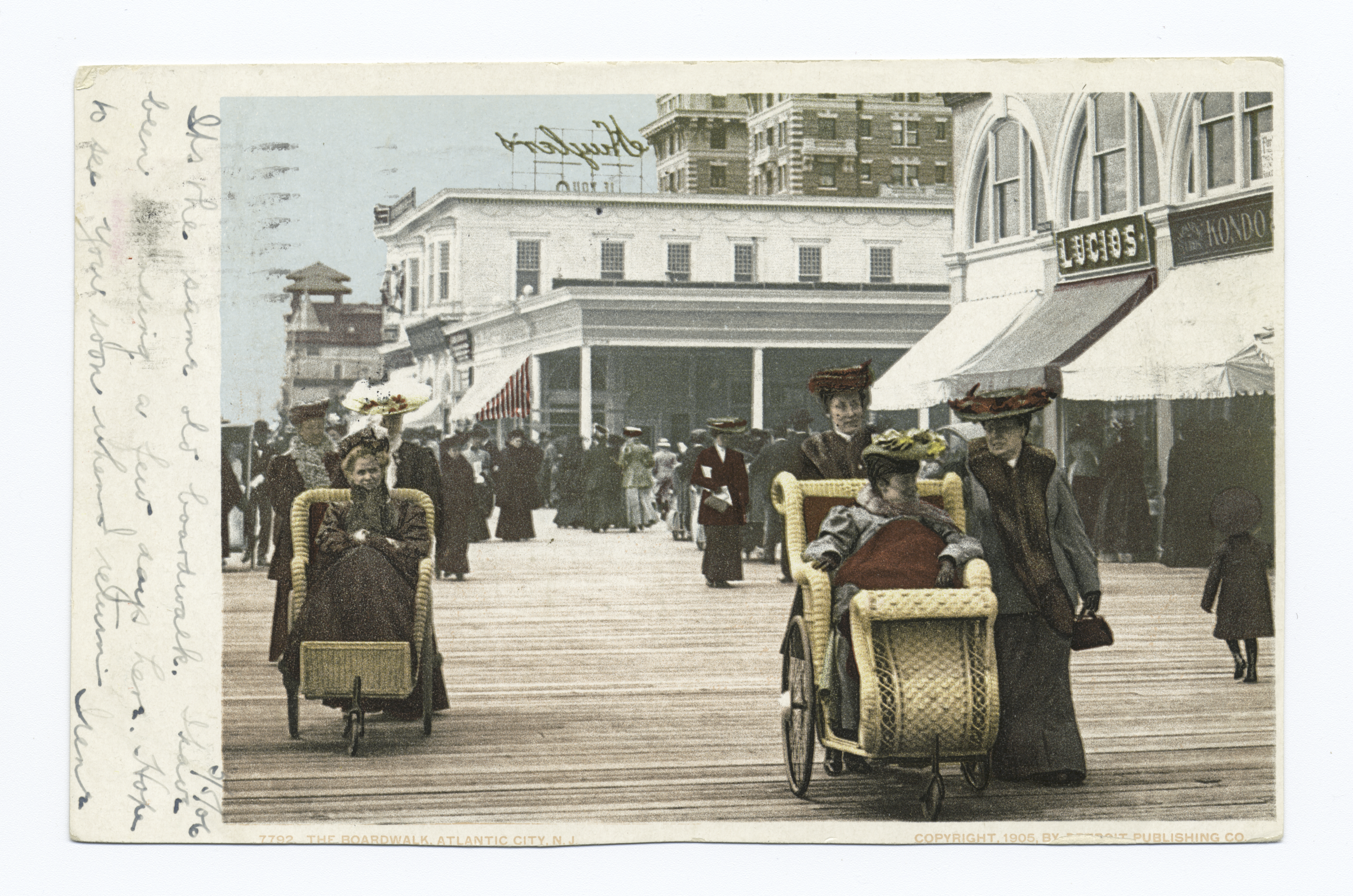
Boardwalk wheelchairs, early 20th century

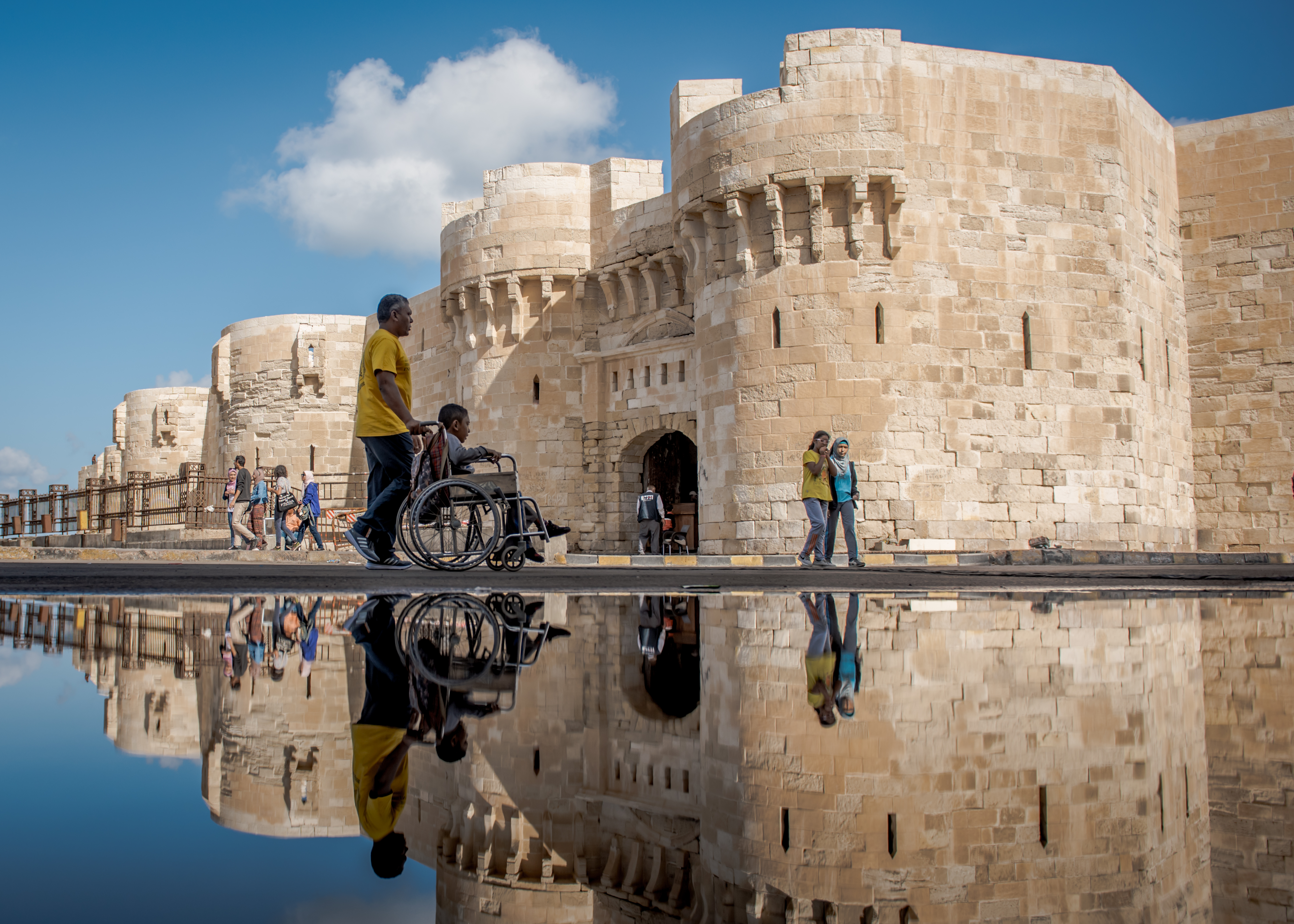
Wheelchairs allow for people with disabilities to travel, like this child in Egypt.

An attendant-propelled wheelchair (also known as a companion or transport chair) is generally similar to a self-propelled manual wheelchair, but with small diameter wheels at both front and rear. The chair is maneuvered and controlled by a person standing at the rear and pushing on handles incorporated into the frame. Braking is supplied directly by the attendant who will usually also be provided with a foot- or hand-operated parking brake.

These chairs are common in institutional settings and as loaner-chairs in large public venues. They are usually constructed from steel as light weight is less of a concern when the user is not required to self-propel.

Specially designed transfer chairs are now required features at airports in much of the developed world in order to allow access down narrow airliner aisles and facilitate the transfer of wheelchair-using passengers to and from their seats on the aircraft.

=== Powered wheelchairs ===
An electric-powered wheelchair, commonly called a "powerchair," incorporates batteries and electric motors into the frame and is controlled by either the user or an attendant, most commonly via a small joystick mounted on the armrest, or on the upper rear of the frame. Alternatives exist for the traditional manual joystick, including head switches, chin-operated joysticks, sip-and-puff controllers or other specialist controls, which may allow independent operation of the wheelchair for a wider population of users with varying motor impairments. Ranges of over 10 miles/15 km are commonly available from standard batteries.

Powerchairs are commonly divided by their access capabilities. An indoor-chair may only reliably be able to cross completely flat surfaces, limiting them to household use. An indoor-outdoor chair is less limited, but may have restricted range or ability to deal with slopes or uneven surfaces. An outdoor chair is more capable, but will still have a very restricted ability to deal with rough terrain. A very few specialist designs offer a true cross-country capability.

Powerchairs have access to the full range of wheelchair options, including ones that are difficult to provide in an unpowered manual chair, but have the disadvantage of significant extra weight. Where an ultra-lightweight manual chair may weigh under 10 kg, the largest outdoor power-chairs may weigh 200 kg or more.

Smaller power chairs often have four wheels, with front or rear wheel drive, but large outdoor designs commonly have six wheels, with small wheels at front and rear and somewhat larger powered wheels in the centre.

A power-assisted wheelchair is a recent development that uses the frame and seating of a typical rigid manual chair while adding powered propulsive capabilities. One approach involves replacing the standard rear wheels with wheels of similar size which incorporate batteries and battery-powered motors in the hubs. A floating rim design senses the pressure applied by the user's push and activates the motors proportionately to provide a power assist. This results in the convenience, and small size of a manual chair while providing motorised assistance for rough/uneven terrain and steep slopes that would otherwise be difficult or impossible to navigate, especially by those with limited upper-body function. As the wheels necessarily come at a weight penalty it is often possible to exchange them with standard wheels to match the capabilities of the wheelchair to the current activity.

=== Mobility scooters ===
Mobility scooters share some features with powerchairs, but primarily address a different market segment, people with a limited ability to walk, but who might not otherwise consider themselves disabled. Smaller mobility scooters are typically three wheeled, with a base on which is mounted a basic seat at the rear, with a control tiller at the front. Larger scooters are frequently four-wheeled, with a much more substantial seat.

Opinions are often polarized as to whether mobility scooters should be considered wheelchairs or not, and negative stereotyping of scooter users can be worse than for some manual or power-chair users. Some commercial organisations draw a distinction between power-chairs and scooters when making access provisions due to a lack of clarity in the law as to whether scooters fall under the same equality legislation as wheelchairs.

=== Single-arm drive wheelchairs ===
One-arm or single arm drive enables a user to self-propel a manual wheelchair using only a single arm. The large wheel on the same side as the arm to be used is fitted with two concentric handrims, one of smaller diameter than the other. On most models the outer, smaller rim, is connected to the wheel on the opposite side by an inner concentric axle. When both handrims are grasped together, the chair may be propelled forward or backward in a straight line. When either handrim is moved independently, only a single wheel is used and the chair will turn left or right in response to the handrim used. Some wheelchairs, designed for use by hemiplegics, provide a similar function by linking both wheels rigidly together and using one of the footplates to control steering via a linkage to the front caster.

=== Reclining and tilting wheelchairs ===
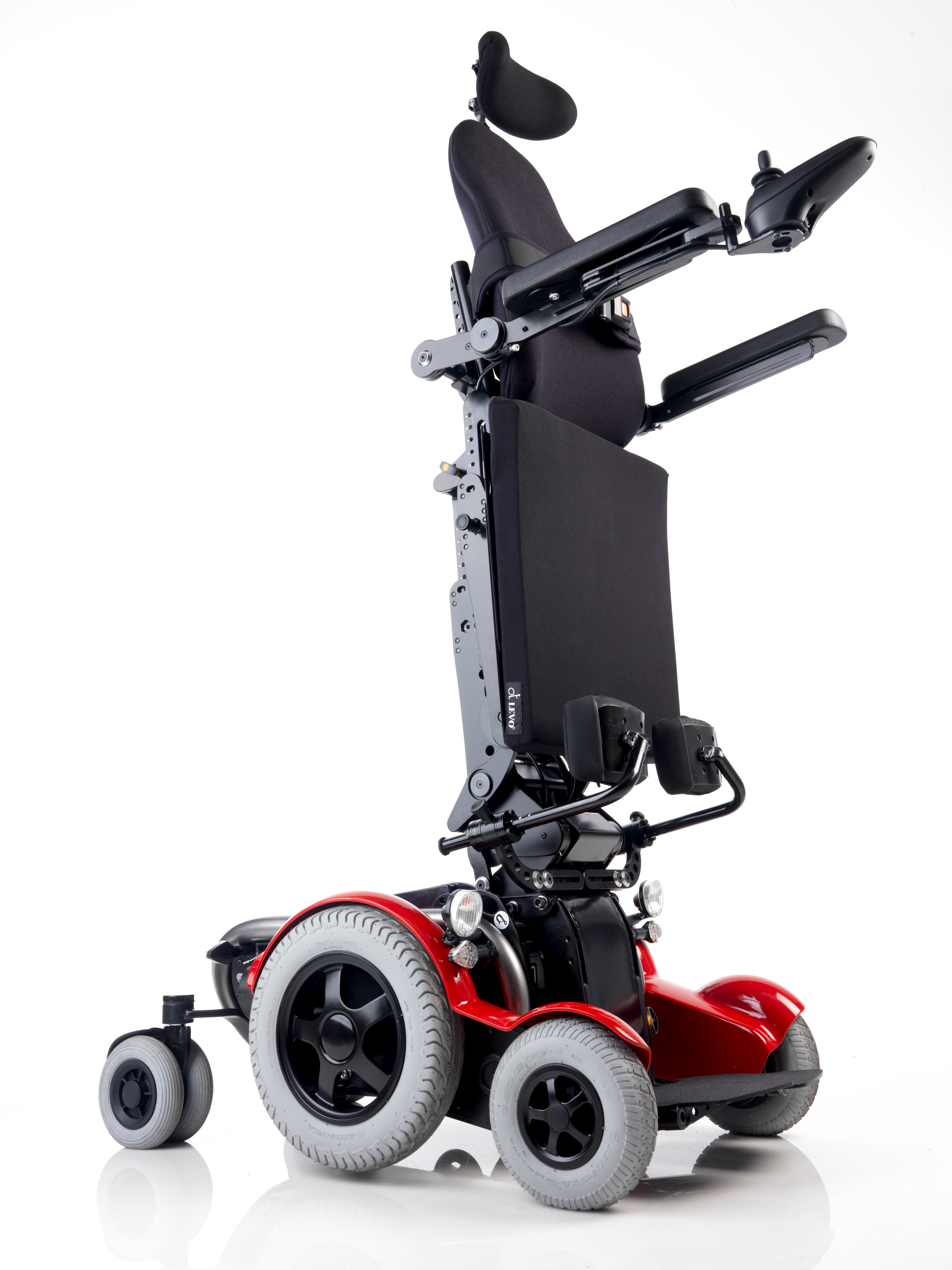
A standing wheelchair with electrical 4-wheel drive and standing functions

Reclining or tilt-in-space wheelchairs have seating surfaces that can be tilted to various angles. The original concept was developed by an orthotist, Hugh Barclay, who worked with disabled children and observed that postural deformities such as scoliosis could be supported or partially corrected by allowing the wheelchair user to relax in a tilted position. The feature is also of value to users who are unable to sit upright for extended periods for pain or other reasons.

In the case of reclining wheelchairs, the seat-back tilts back, and the leg rests can be raised, while the seat base remains in the same position, somewhat similar to a common recliner chair. Some reclining wheelchairs lean back far enough that the user can lie down completely flat. Reclining wheelchairs are preferred in some cases for some medical purposes, such as reducing the risk of pressure sores, providing passive movement of hip and knee joints, and making it easier to perform some nursing procedures, such as intermittent catheterization to empty the bladder and transfers to beds, and also for personal reasons, such as people who like using an attached tray. The use of reclining wheelchairs is particularly common among people with spinal cord injuries such as quadriplegia.

In the case of tilting wheelchairs, the seat-back, seat base, and leg rests tilt back as one unit, somewhat similar to the way a person might tip a four-legged chair backward to balance it on the back legs. While fully reclining spreads the person's weight over the entire back side of the body, tilting wheelchairs transfer it from only the buttocks and thighs (in the seated position) to partially on the back and head (in the tilted position). Tilting wheelchairs are preferred for people who use molded or contoured seats, who need to maintain a particular posture, who are adversely affected by sheer forces (reclining causes the body to slide slightly every time), or who need to keep a communication device, powered wheelchair controls, or other attached device in the same relative position throughout the day. Tilting wheelchairs are commonly used by people with cerebral palsy, people with some muscle diseases, and people with limited range of motion in the hip or knee joints. Tilting options are more common than reclining options in wheelchairs designed for use by children.

=== Standing wheelchairs ===
A standing wheelchair is designed to support the user in a near-standing position. They can be used as both a wheelchair and a standing frame, allowing the user to sit or stand in the wheelchair as they wish. Some versions are entirely manual, others have a powered stand on an otherwise manual chair, while others have full power, tilt, recline and variations of powered stand functions available. The benefits of such a device include, but are not limited to: aiding independence and productivity, raising self-esteem and psychological well-being, heightening social status, extending access, relief of pressure, reduction of pressure sores, improved functional reach, improved respiration, reduced occurrence of UTI, improved flexibility, help in maintaining bone mineral density, improved passive range motion, reduction in abnormal muscle tone and spasticity, and skeletal deformities. Other wheelchairs provide some of the same benefits by raising the entire seat to lift the user to standing height.

=== Sports wheelchairs ===
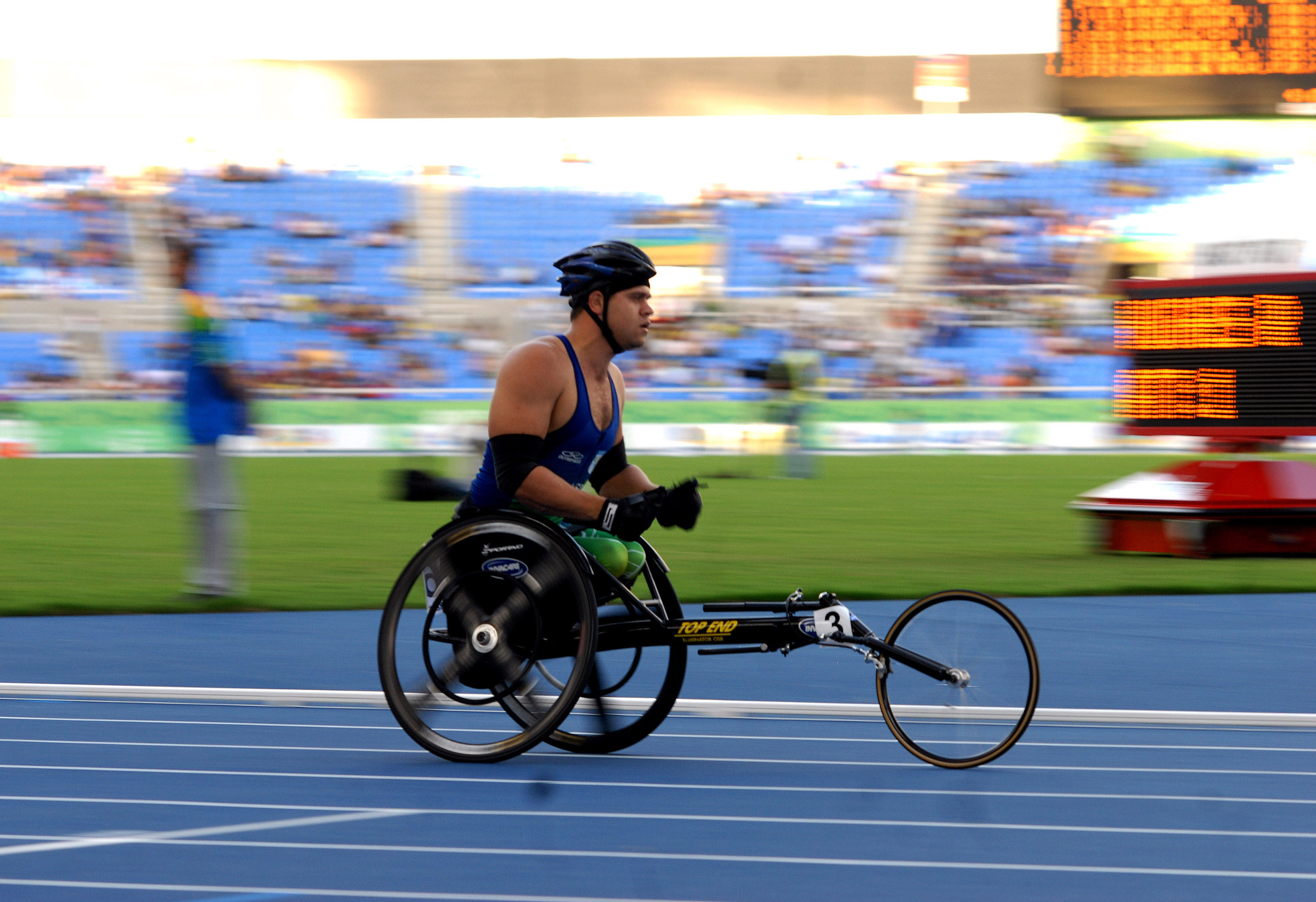
A modern racing wheelchair

A range of disabled sports have been developed for disabled athletes, including basketball, rugby, tennis, racing and dancing. The wheelchairs used for each sport have evolved to suit the specific needs of that sport and often no longer resemble their everyday cousins. They are usually non-folding (in order to increase rigidity), with a pronounced negative camber for the wheels (which provides stability and is helpful for making sharp turns), and often are made of composite, lightweight materials. Even seating positions may be radically different, with racing wheelchairs generally used in a kneeling position. Sport wheelchairs are rarely suited for everyday use, and are often a 'second' chair specifically for sports use, although some users prefer the sports options for everyday use. Some disabled people, specifically lower-limb amputees, may use a wheelchair for sports, but not for everyday activities.

==== Motorized wheelchair sports ====
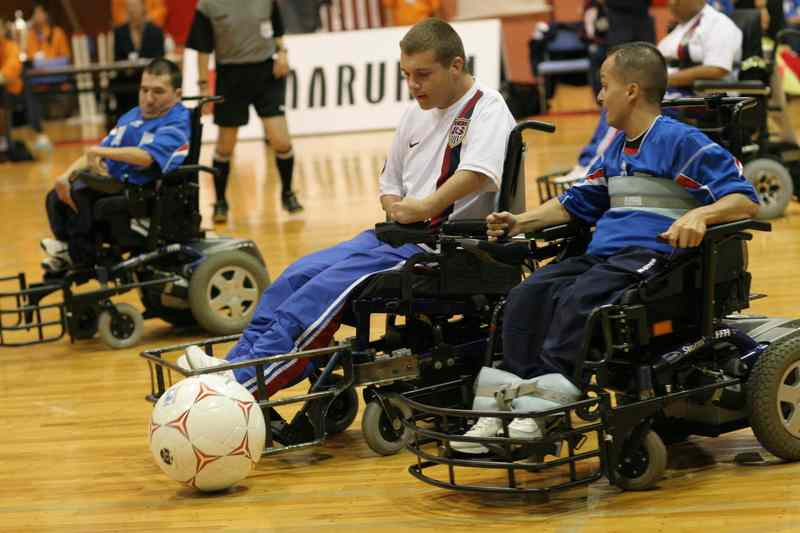
US vs. France, FIPFA World Cup, Tokyo, Japan, October 2007

While most wheelchair sports use manual chairs, some power chair sports, such as powerchair football, exist. Hockey can also be played from electrical wheelchairs.

=== Wheelchair stretchers ===
Wheelchair stretchers are a variant of wheeled stretchers/gurneys that can accommodate a sitting patient, or be adjusted to lie flat to help in the lateral (or supine) transfer of a patient from a bed to the chair or back. Once transferred, the stretcher can be adjusted to allow the patient to assume a sitting position.

=== All-terrain wheelchairs ===
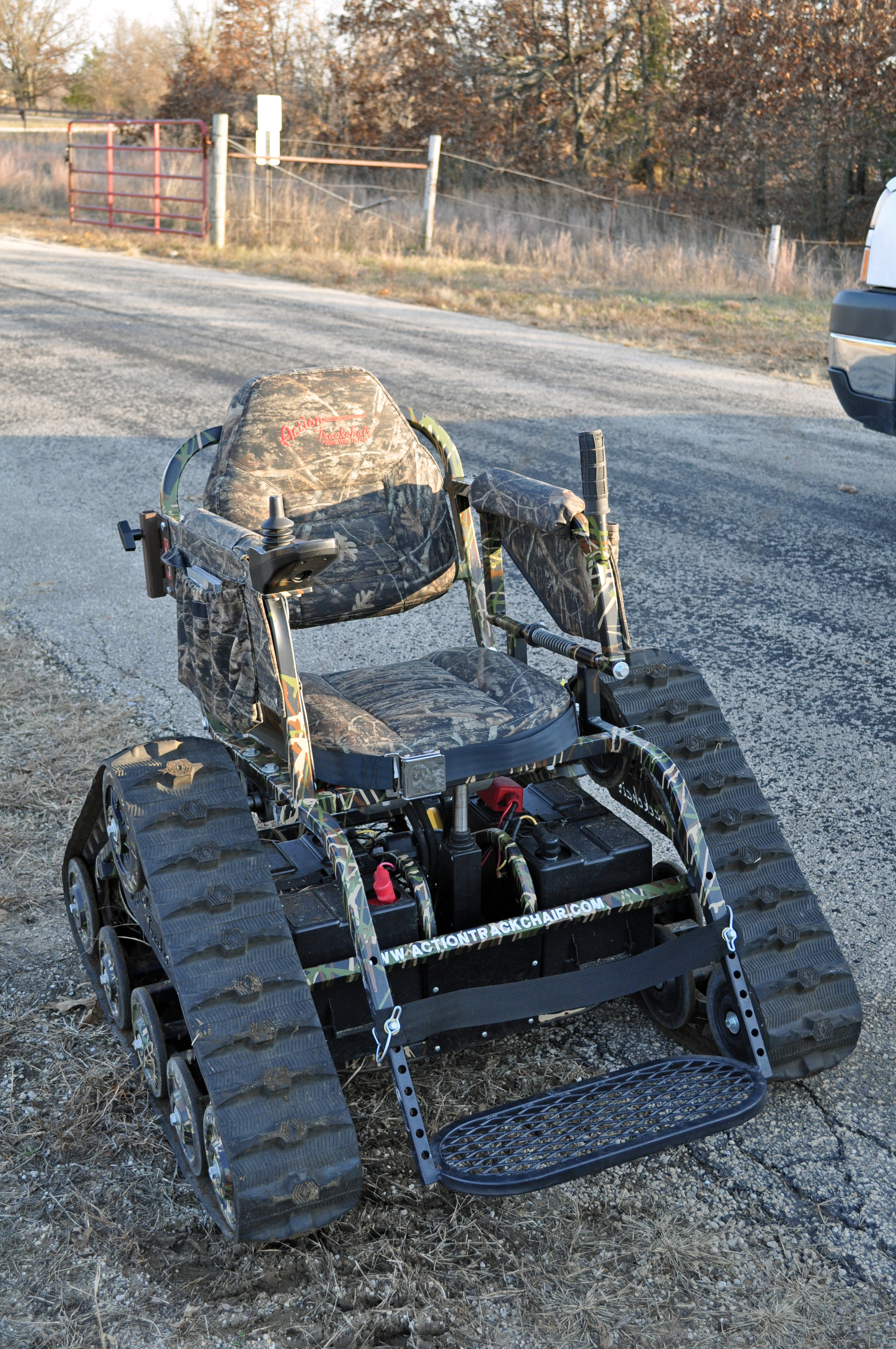
Tracked all-terrain wheelchair

All-terrain wheelchairs can allow users to access terrain otherwise completely inaccessible to a wheelchair user. Two different formats have been developed. One hybridises wheelchair and mountain bike technology, generally taking the form of a frame within which the user sits and with four mountain bike wheels at the corners. In general, there are no push-rims and propulsion/braking is by pushing directly on the tyres.

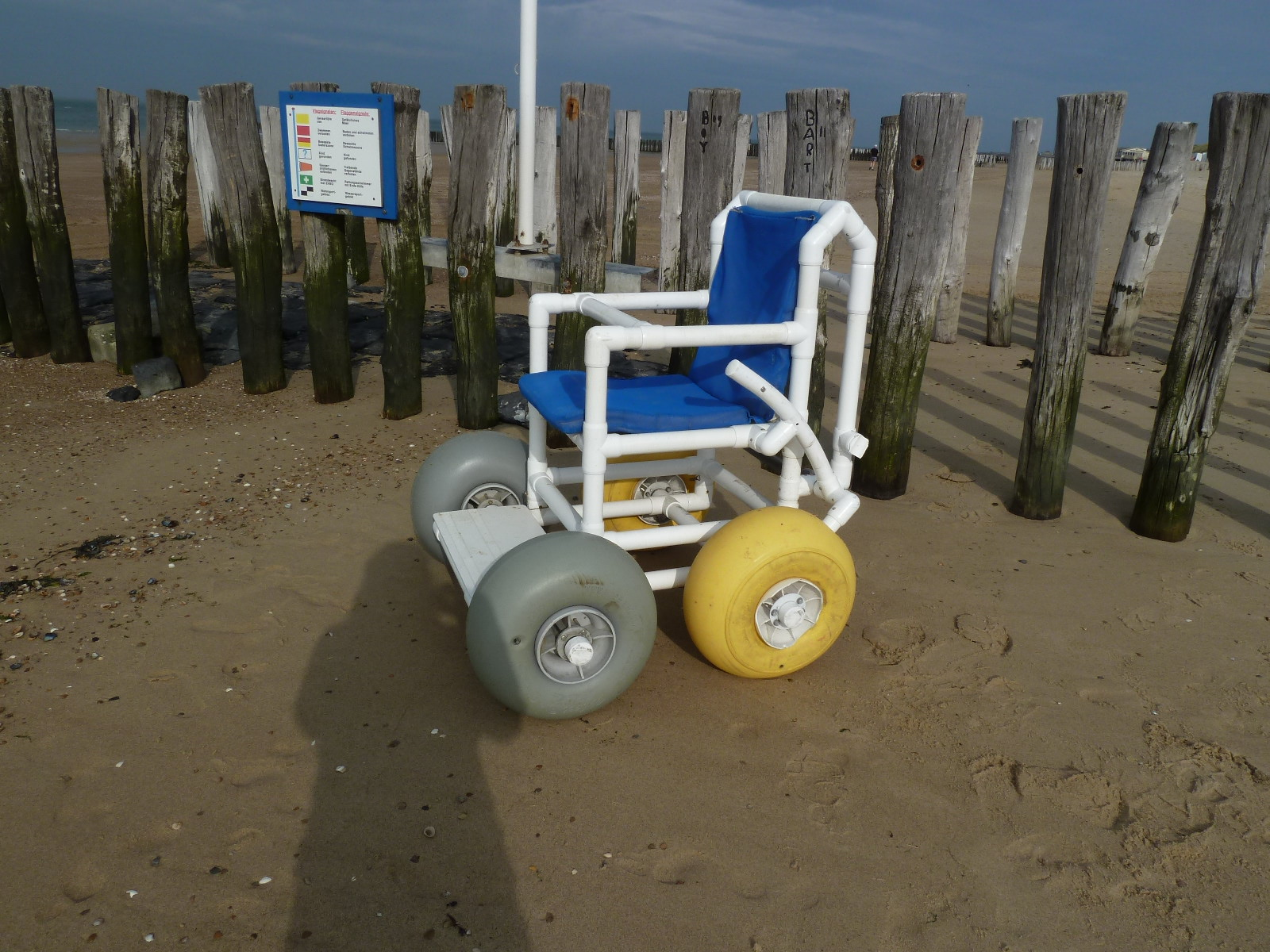
A beach wheelchair

A more common variant is the beach wheelchair (beach-going wheelchair) which can allow better mobility on beach sand, including in the water, on uneven terrain, and even on snow. The common adaptation among the different designs is that they have extra-wide balloon wheels or tires, to increase stability and decrease ground pressure on uneven or unsteady terrain. Different models are available, both manual and battery-driven. In some countries in Europe, where accessible tourism is well established, many beaches have wheelchairs of this type available for loan/hire.

=== Smart wheelchairs ===
A smart wheelchair is any powerchair using a control system to augment or replace user control. Its purpose is to reduce or eliminate the user's task of driving a powerchair. Usually, a smart wheelchair is controlled via a computer, has a suite of sensors and applies techniques in mobile robotics, but this is not necessary. The type of sensors most frequently used by smart wheelchairs are the ultrasonic acoustic range finder (i.e. sonar) and infrared red (IR) range finder. The interface may consist of a conventional wheelchair joystick, a "sip-and-puff" device or a touch-sensitive display. This differs from a conventional powerchair, in which the user exerts manual control over speed and direction without intervention by the wheelchair's control system.

Smart wheelchairs are designed for a variety of user types. Some are designed for users with cognitive impairments, such as dementia, these typically apply collision-avoidance techniques to ensure that users do not accidentally select a drive command that results in a collision. Others focus on users living with severe motor disabilities, such as cerebral palsy, or with quadriplegia, and the role of the smart wheelchair is to interpret small muscular activations as high-level commands and execute them. Such wheelchairs typically employ techniques from artificial intelligence, such as path-planning.

=== Technological developments ===
Recent technological advances are slowly improving wheelchair and powerchair technology.

A variation on the manually propelled wheelchair is the Leveraged Freedom Chair (LFC), designed by the MIT Mobility Lab. This wheelchair is designed to be low-cost, constructed with local materials, for users in developing countries. Engineering modifications have added hand-controlled levers to the LFC, to enable users to move the chair over uneven ground and minor obstacles, such as bumpy dirt roads, that are common in developing countries. It is under development, and has been tested in Kenya and India so far.

The addition of geared, all-mechanical wheels for manual wheelchairs is a new development incorporating a hypocycloidal reduction gear into the wheel design. The 2-gear wheels can be added to a manual wheelchair. The geared wheels provide a user with additional assistance by providing leverage through gearing (like a bicycle, not a motor). The two-gear wheels offer two speed ratios- 1:1 (no help, no extra torque) and 2:1, providing 100% more hill climbing force. The low gear incorporates an automatic "hill hold" function which holds the wheelchair in place on a hill between pushes, but will allow the user to override the hill hold to roll the wheels backward if needed. The low gear also provides downhill control when descending.

A recent development related to wheelchairs is the handcycle. They come in a variety of forms, from the road and track racing models to off-road types modelled after mountain bikes. While dedicated handcycle designs are manufactured, clip-on versions are available that can convert a manual wheelchair to a handcycle in seconds. The general concept is a clip-on front-fork with hand-pedals, usually attaching to a mounting on the footplate. A somewhat related concept is the Freewheel, a large dolley wheel attaching to the front of a manual wheelchair, again generally to the footplate mounting, which improves wheelchair performance over rough terrain. Unlike a handcycle, a wheelchair with a Freewheel continues to be propelled via the rear wheels. There are several types of hybrid-powered handcycles in which hand-pedals and used along with the electrical motor that helps on hills and large distances.

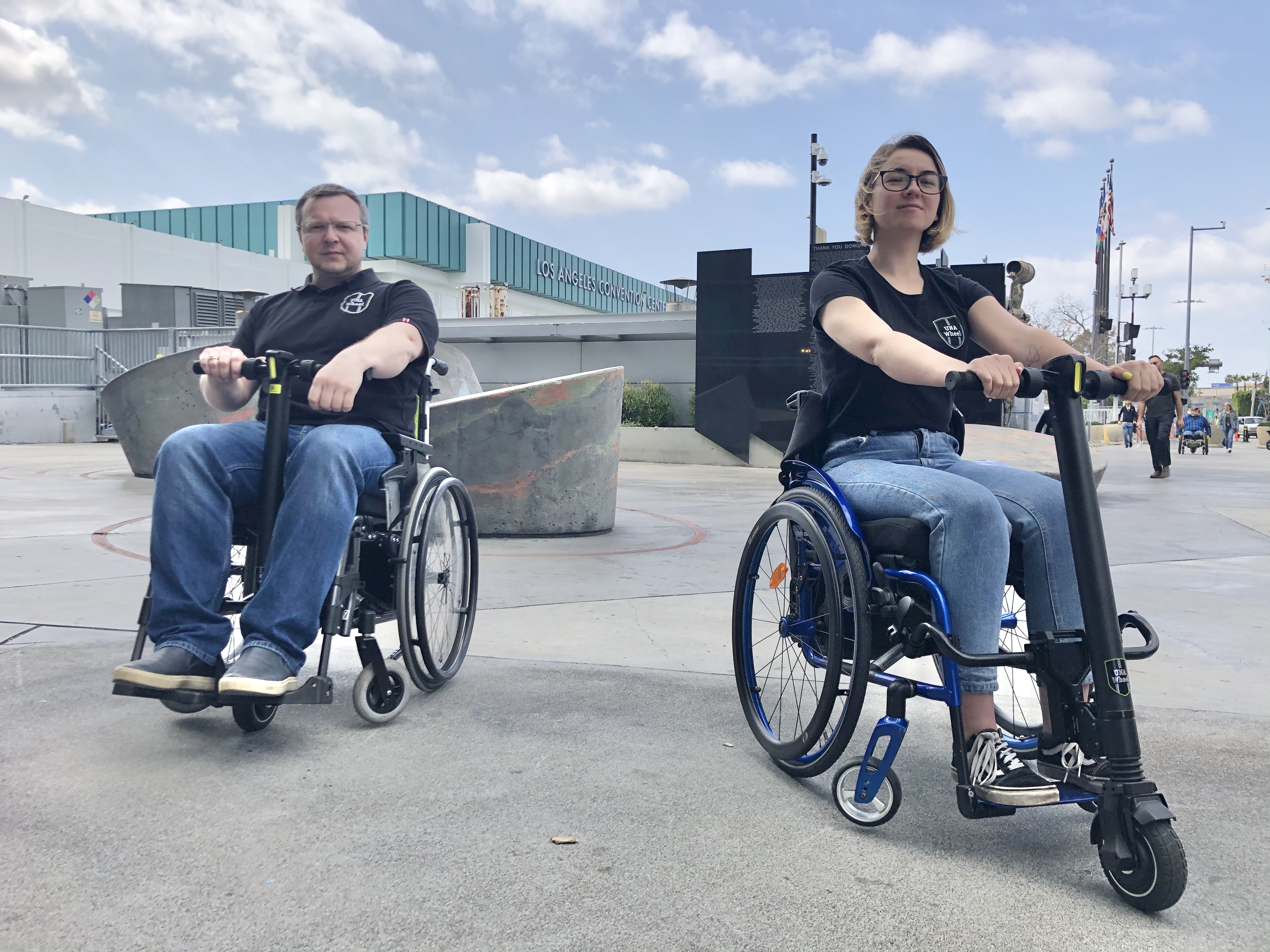
A wheelchair with a lightweight power add-on attached

The most recent generation of clip-on handcycles are fully electrical wheelchair power add-ons that use lithium-ion battery, brushless DC electric motor's and light-weight aluminium frames with easy to attach clamps that convert wheelchairs into steerable trikes. This makes long-distance journeys and everyday tasks easier, consequently, it also improves hand hygiene.

There have been significant efforts over the past 20 years to develop stationary wheelchair trainer platforms that could enable wheelchair users to exercise as one would on a treadmill or bicycle trainer. Some devices have been created that could be used in conjunction with virtual travel and interactive gaming similar to an omnidirectional treadmill. This convergence of virtual reality and a treadmill has been used for pediatric and adult rehabilitation to regain walking skills.

In 2011, British inventor Andrew Slorance developed Carbon Black the first wheelchair to be made almost entirely out of carbon fiber

Recently, EPFL's CNBI project has succeeded in making wheelchairs that can be controlled by brain impulses.

Interest in stair-climbing wheelchairs, which are designed to navigate stairs, has increased over the past two decades. Therefore, many electric wheelchairs with the ability to climb stairs have been developed. Electric-powered wheelchairs with climbing ability need to be stronger and have greater movement in comparison to an electric-powered wheelchair that cannot climb stairs. They must also be stable in order to prevent injury to the wheelchair user. There are currently a number of electric powered wheelchairs that are able to climb stairs available to purchase. Technical developments are continuing in this area.

Experiments have also been made with unusual variant wheels, like the omniwheel or the Mecanum wheel. These allow for a broader spectrum of movement, but have made no mass-market penetration. The electric wheelchair shown on the right is fitted with Mecanum wheels (sometimes known as Ilon wheels) which give it complete freedom of movement. It can be driven forwards, backward, sideways, and diagonally, and also turned around on the spot or turned around while moving, all operated from a simple joystick.

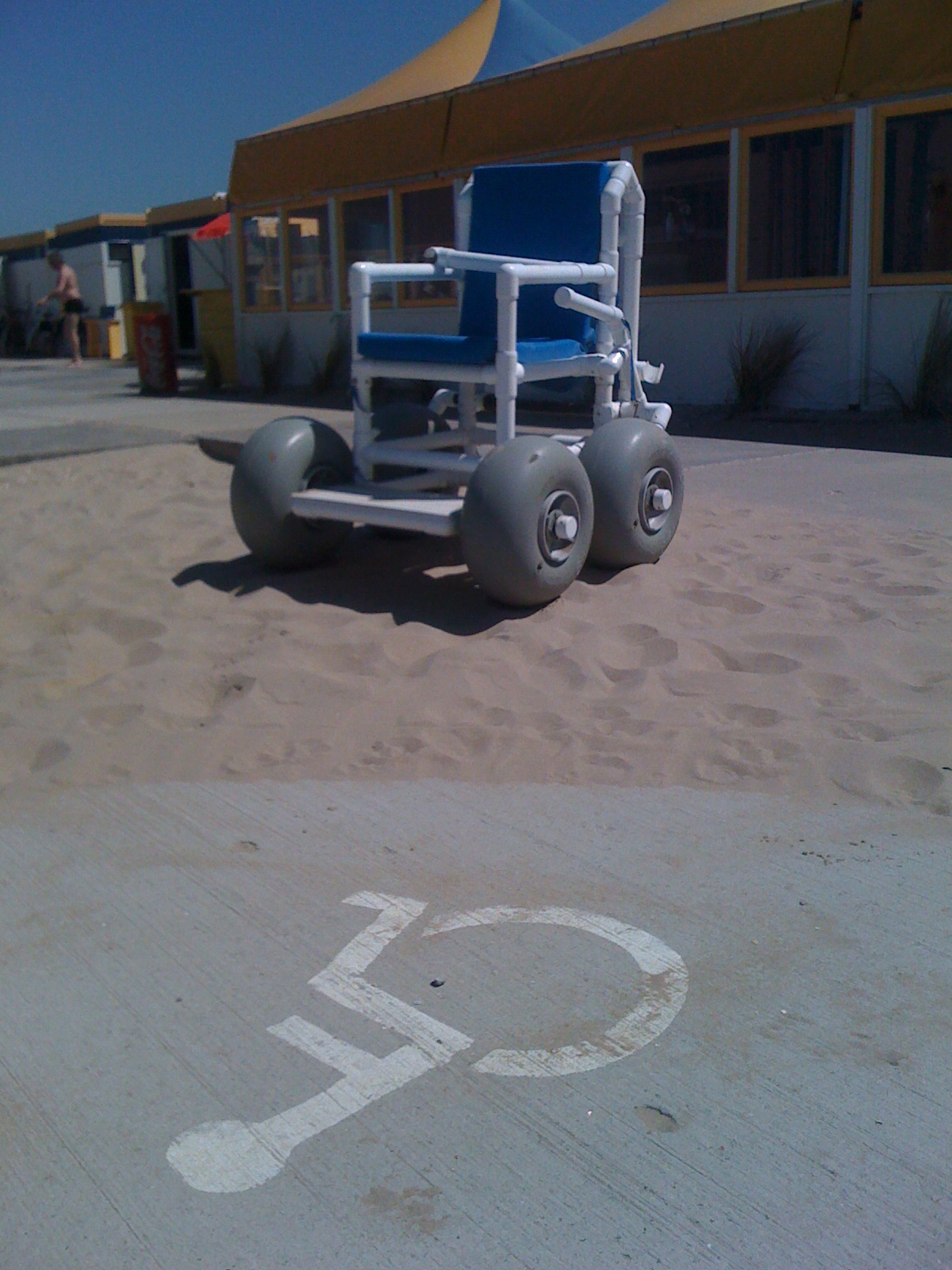
A beach wheelchair at a public beach in the Netherlands

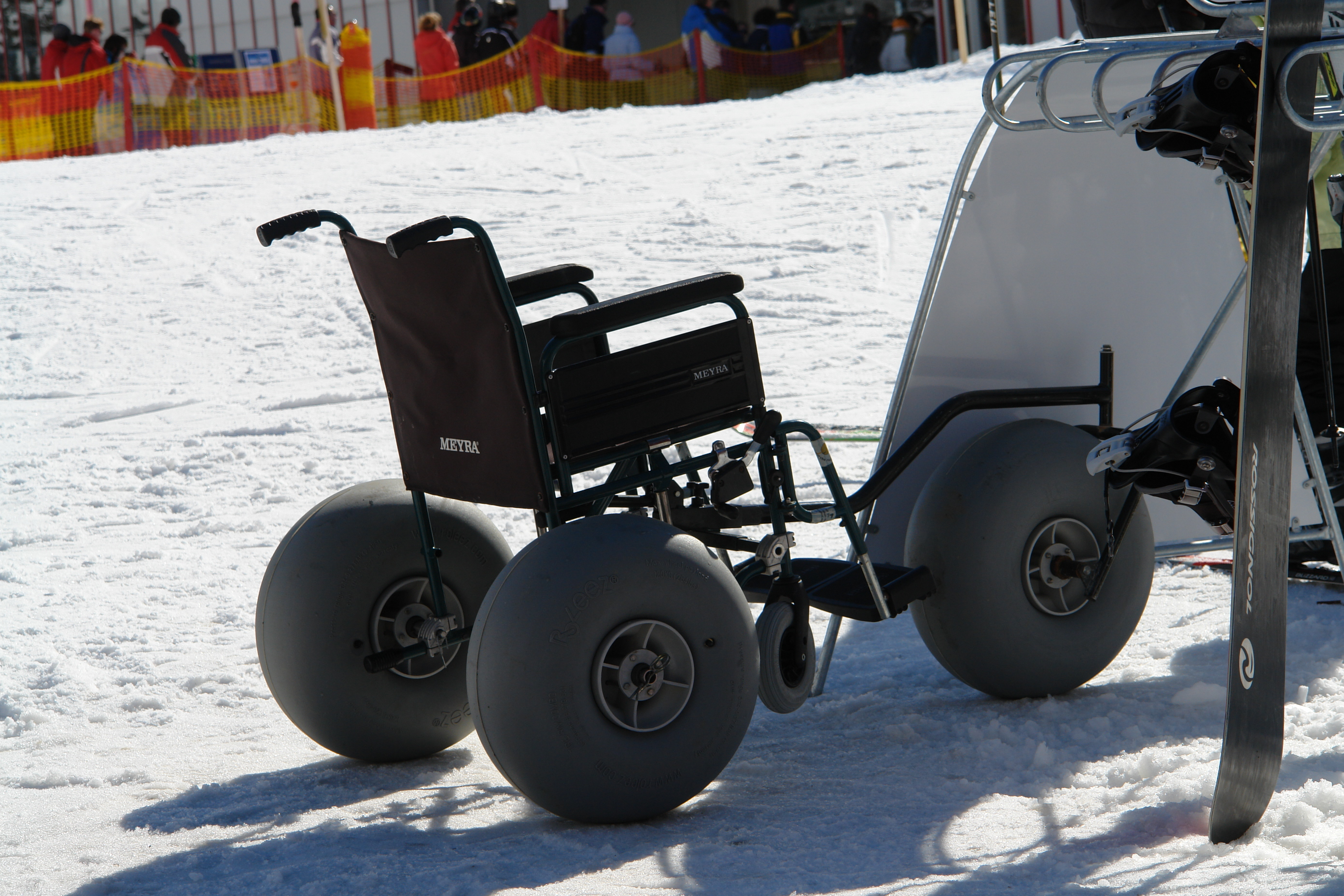
A snow wheelchair at an outdoor park

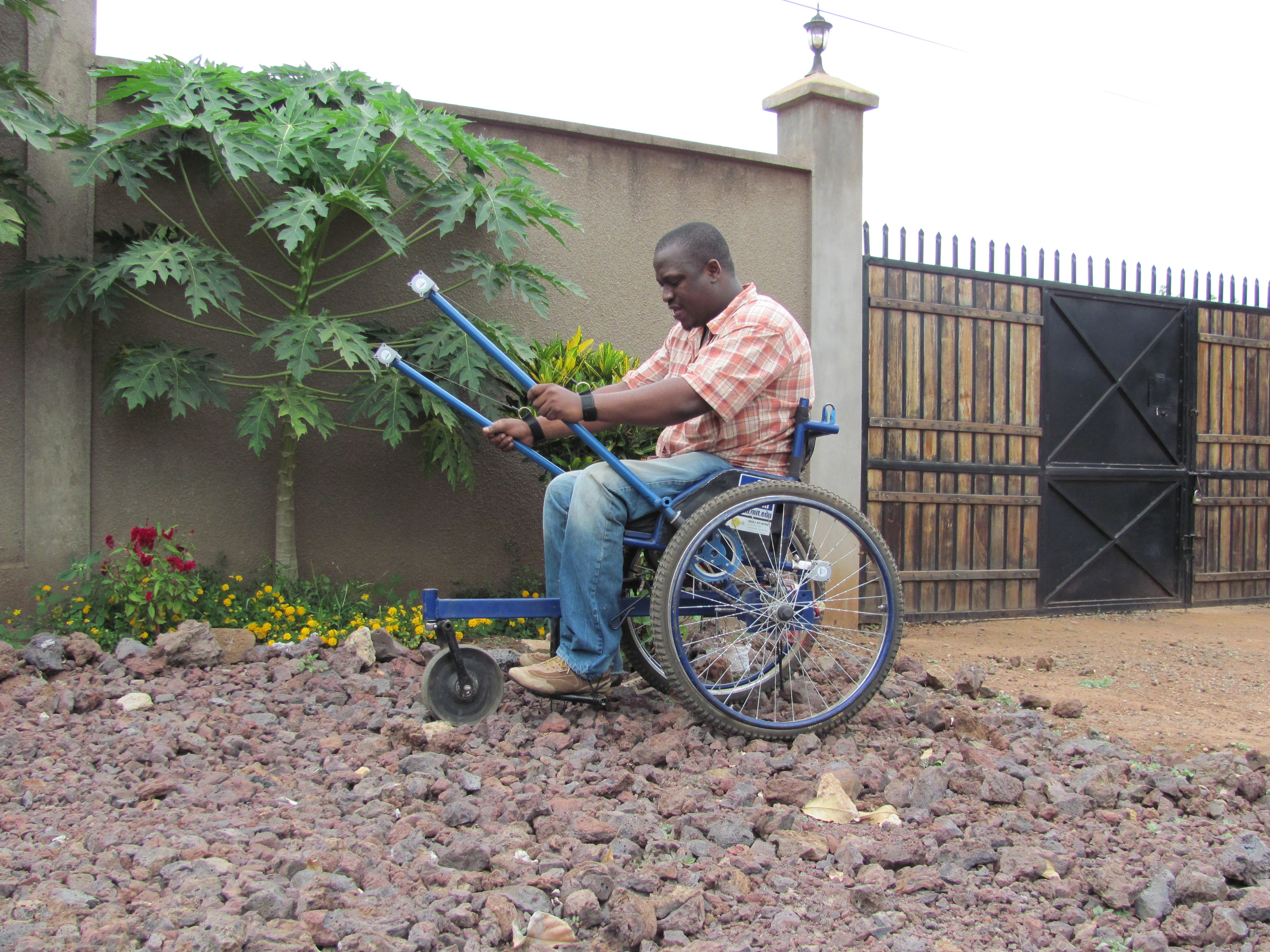
A Leveraged Freedom Chair wheelchair user in Kenya. The chair has been engineered to be low-cost and usable on the rough roads common in developing countries.

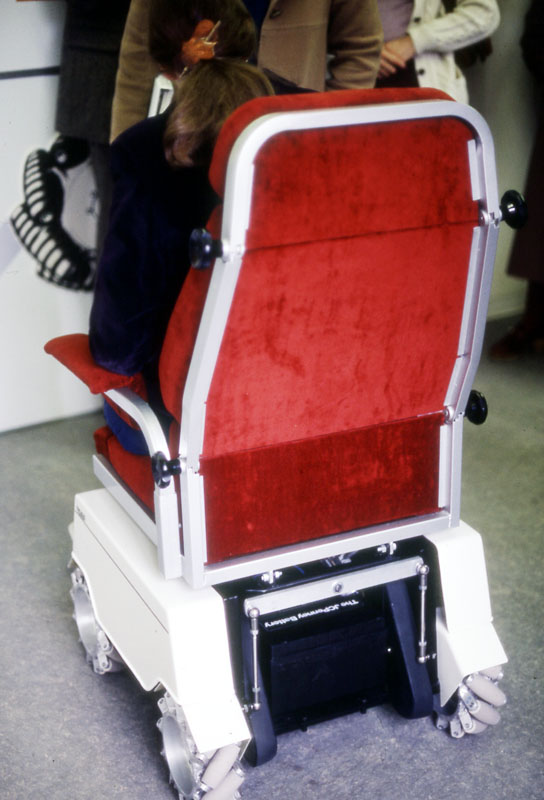
Wheelchair fitted with Mecanum wheels, taken at a trade fair in the early 1980s

=== Other variants ===
- Foot propulsion of a manual wheelchair by the occupant is possible for users who have limited hand movement capabilities or simply do not wish to use their hands for propulsion. Foot propulsion also allows patients to exercise their legs to increase blood flow and limit further disability. Users who do this commonly may elect to have a lower seat height and no footplate to better suit the wheelchair to their needs.
- Wheelbase chairs are powered or manual wheelchairs with especially molded seating systems interfaced with them for users with a more complicated posture. A molded seating system involves taking a cast of a person's best achievable seated position and then either carving the shape from memory foam or forming a plastic mesh around it. This seat is then covered, framed, and attached to a wheelbase.
- A bariatric wheelchair is one designed to support larger weights; most standard chairs are designed to support no more than 250 lb (113 kg) on average.
- Pediatric wheelchairs are another available subset of wheelchairs. These can address needs such as being able to play on the floor with other children, or cater for children in large hip-spica casts due to problems such as hip dysplasia.
- Hemi wheelchairs have lower seats which are designed for easy foot propulsion. The decreased seat height also allows them to be used by children and shorter individuals.
- A knee scooter is a related device with some features of a wheelchair and some walking aids. Unlike wheelchairs they are only suitable for below knee injuries to a single leg. The user rests the injured leg on the scooter, grasps the handlebars, and pushes with the uninjured leg.
- Some walkers can be used as a wheelchair. These walkers have seat and foot plates, so an attendant can push while the patient is sitting on the walker. This is useful for a person who gets tired while walking with a walker, or has a limited walking range meaning the person can walk, but after a while, the person will collapse and fall to the ground.
- A commode wheelchair is a wheelchair made for the bathroom. A commode wheelchair has a hole in the seat so the user does not have to transfer into the toilet. Sometimes the hole can be covered. Sometimes there is a pan attached to the hole, so the user can urinate/defecate without having to wheel over the toilet.

== Mobility and access ==
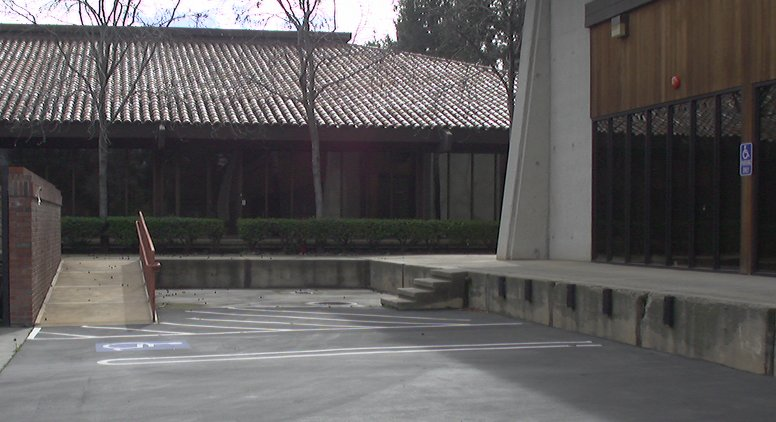
Wheelchair ramp and accessible parking space in California

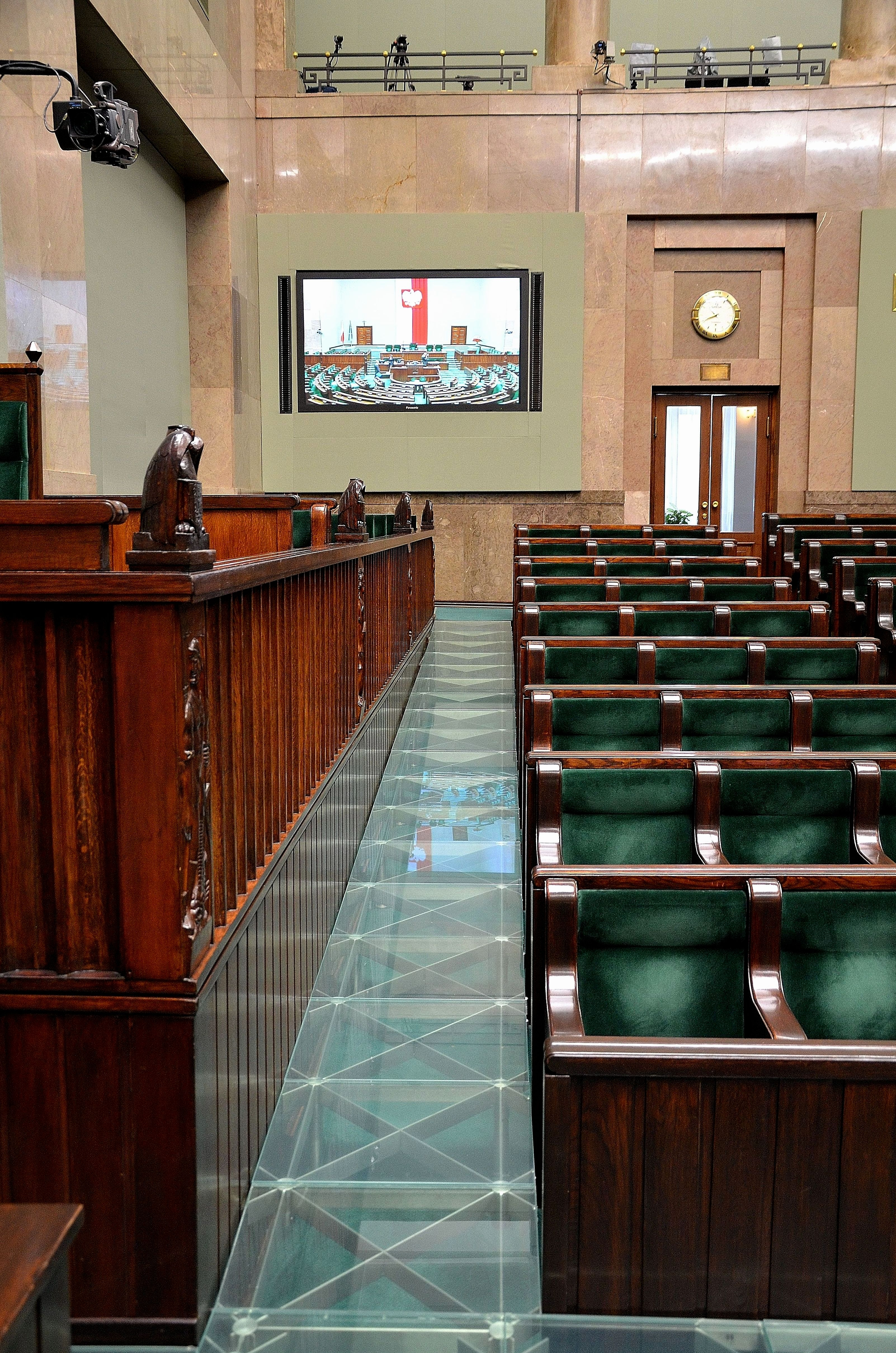
Wheelchair ramp in the Sejm, lower chamber of the Polish parliament in Warsaw

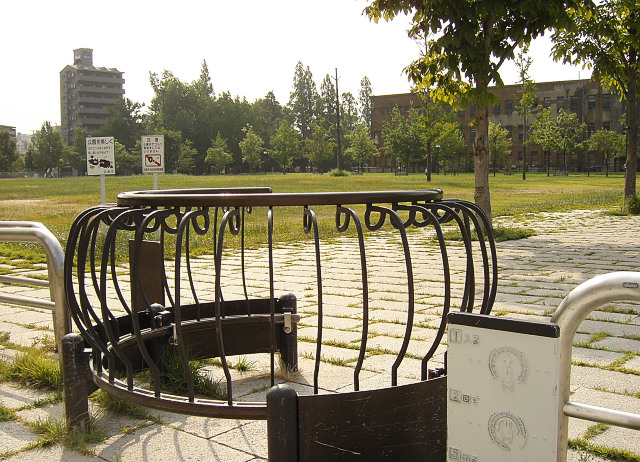
A gate for wheelchairs in Hiroshima

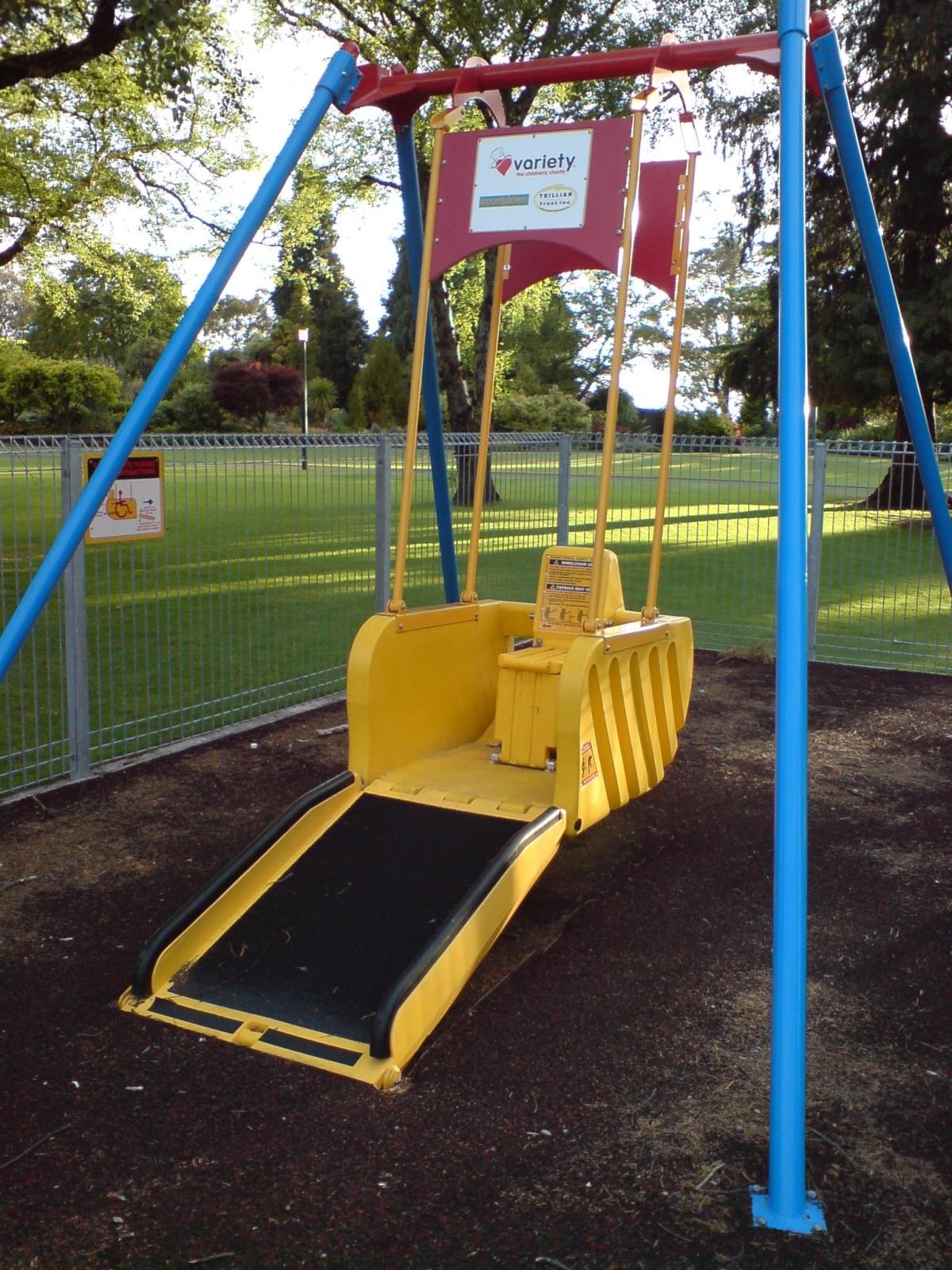
A wheelchair-swing on a playground in New Zealand

The universal sign for accessible parking

=== Buildings ===
Adapting the built environment to make it more accessible to wheelchair users is one of the key campaigns of disability rights movements and local equality legislation such as the Americans with Disabilities Act of 1990 (ADA). The social model of disability defines 'disability' as the discrimination experienced by people with impairments as a result of the failure of society to provide the adaptions needed for them to participate in society as equals. This includes both physical adaptions of the built environment and adaption of organizational and social structures and attitudes. A core principle of access is universal design – that all people regardless of disability are entitled to equal access to all parts of society like public transportation and buildings. A wheelchair user is less disabled in an environment without stairs.

Access starts outside of the building, with the provision of reduced height kerb-cuts where wheelchair users may need to cross roads, and the provision of adequate wheelchair parking, which must provide extra space in order to allow wheelchair users to transfer directly from seat to chair. Some tension exists between access provisions for visually impaired pedestrians and wheelchair users and other mobility impaired pedestrians as textured paving, vital for visually impaired people to recognise the edge of features such as light-controlled crossings, is uncomfortable at best, and dangerous at worst, to those with mobility impairments.

For access to public buildings, it is frequently necessary to adapt older buildings with features such as ramps or elevators in order to allow access by wheelchair users and other people with mobility impairments. Other important adaptations can include powered doors, lowered fixtures such as sinks and water fountains, and accessible toilets with adequate space and grab bars to allow the disabled person to transfer out of their wheelchair onto the fixture. Access needs for people with other disabilities, for instance visual impairments, may also be required, such as by provision of high visibility markings on the edges of steps and braille labelling. Increasingly new construction for public use is required by local equality laws to have these features incorporated at the design stage.

The same principles of access that apply to public buildings also apply to private homes and may be required as part of local building regulations. Important adaptations include external access, providing sufficient space for a wheelchair user to move around the home, doorways that are wide enough for convenient use, access to upper floors, where they exist, which can be provided either by dedicated wheelchair lifts, or in some cases by using a stairlift to transfer between wheelchairs on different floors, and by providing accessible bathrooms with showers and/or bathtubs that are designed for accessibility. Accessible bathrooms can permit the use of mobile shower chairs or transfer benches to facilitate bathing for people with disabilities. Wet rooms are bathrooms where the shower floor and bathroom floor are one continuous waterproof surface. Such floor designs allow a wheelchair user using a dedicated shower chair, or transferring onto a shower seat, to enter the shower without needing to overcome a barrier or lip.

The construction of low floor trams and buses are increasingly required by law, whereas the use of inaccessible features such as paternoster lifts in public buildings without any alternative methods of wheelchair access is increasingly deprecated. Modern architecture is increasingly required by law and recognised good practise to incorporate better accessibility at the design stage.

In many countries, such as the UK, the owners of inaccessible buildings who have not provided permanent access measures are still required by local equality legislation to provide 'reasonable adjustments' to ensure that disabled people are able to access their services and are not excluded. These may range from keeping a portable ramp on hand to allow a wheelchair user to cross an inaccessible threshold, to providing personal service to access goods they are not otherwise able to reach.

=== Vehicles ===
Public transit vehicles are increasingly required to be accessible to people who use wheelchairs.

- In the UK, all buses were required to be accessible to wheelchair users by 2017, and all coaches by 2020. Similar requirements exist for trains, with most trains already incorporating a number of wheelchair-spaces.
- The EU has required airline and airport operators to support the use of airports and airliners by wheelchair users and other 'Persons with Reduced Mobility' since the introduction of EU Directive EC1107/2006.
- In the Seattle metropolitan area, all public transit and stations (buses, light rail, streetcars, monorail, ferries, Sounder trains, Amtrak) are accessible to wheelchairs, scooters, bicycles, and rollators.
- In Los Angeles there is a program to remove a small amount of seating on some trains to make more room for bicycles and wheelchairs.
- New York City's entire bus system is wheelchair-accessible, and a multimillion-dollar renovation program is underway to provide elevator access to many of the city's 485 subway stations.
- In Adelaide, Australia, all public transport has provision for at least two wheelchairs per bus, tram or train. In addition, all trains have space available for bicycles.
- The Washington, D.C. Metro system features complete accessibility on all its subways and buses.
- In Paris, France, the entire bus network, i.e. 60 lines, has been accessible to wheelchair users since 2010.

In the United States, a wheelchair that has been designed and tested for use as a seat in motor vehicles is often referred to as a "WC19 Wheelchair" or a "transit wheelchair". ANSI-RESNA WC19 (officially, SECTION 19 ANSI/RESNA WC/VOL. 1 Wheelchairs for use in Motor Vehicles) is a voluntary standard for wheelchairs designed for use when traveling facing forward in a motor vehicle. ISO 7176/19 is an international transit wheelchair standard that specifies similar design and performance requirements as ANSI/RESNA WC19.

There are special vans equipped for wheelchairs. These vans are large and have a ramp on a side door or the back door, so a wheelchair can get inside the vehicle while the user is still in it. Some of the back seats will be removed and replaced with wheelchair security harnesses. Sometimes wheelchair vans are equipped so the wheelchair user can drive the van without getting out of the wheelchair.

A vehicle can be equipped with hand controls. Hand controls are used when a person cannot move their legs to push the pedals. The hand controls do the pushing of the pedals. Some racecar drivers are paralyzed and use hand controls.

=== Public realm ===
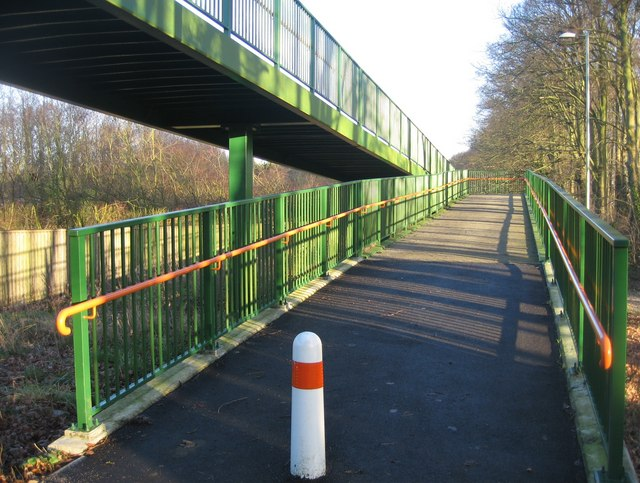
This footbridge includes a step-free ramp to assist wheelchair users.

Some elements of the outdoor public realm present barriers to wheelchair use, such as grade-separated areas where no ramps are provided. UK guidance recommends a minimum width of 1.5m for a wheelchair user and an ambulant pedestrian to move side by side; with maximum ramp gradients of 8% for manual wheelchair use (5% is preferred).

== Distribution organizations ==
Several organizations exist that help to give and receive wheelchair equipment. Organizations that accept wheelchair equipment donations typically attempt to identify recipients and match them with the donated equipment they have received. Organizations that accept donations in the form of money for wheelchairs typically have the wheelchairs manufactured and distributed in large numbers, often in developing countries. Organizations focusing on wheelchairs include Direct Relief, the Free Wheelchair Mission, Hope Haven, Personal Energy Transportation, the Wheelchair Foundation and WheelPower.

In the United Kingdom wheelchairs are supplied and maintained free of charge for non-ambulatory disabled people.

== Seating systems ==
Wheelchair seating systems are designed both to support the user in the sitting position and to redistribute pressure from areas of the body that are at risk of pressure ulcers. For someone in the sitting position, the parts of the body that are the most at risk for tissue breakdown include the ischial tuberosities, coccyx, sacrum and greater trochanters. Wheelchair cushions are the prime method of delivering this protection and are nearly universally used. Wheelchair cushions are also used to provide stability, comfort, aid posture and absorb shock. Wheelchair cushions range from simple blocks of foam costing a few pounds or dollars, to specifically engineered multilayer designs with costs running into the hundreds of dollars.

Prior to 1970, little was known about the effectiveness of wheelchair cushions and there was not a clinical method of evaluating wheelchair seat cushions. Most recently, pressure imaging (or pressure mapping) is used to help determine each individual's pressure distribution to properly determine and fit a seating system.

While almost all wheelchair users will use a wheelchair cushion, some users need more extensive postural support. This can be provided by adaptions to the back of the wheelchair, which can provide increased rigidity, head/neck rests and lateral support and in some cases by adaptions to the seat such as pommels and knee-blocks. Harnesses may also be required.

== Accessories ==
There is a wide range of accessories for wheelchairs. Common wheelchair accessories include cushions, cup holders, seat belts, storage bags, and lights. Seatbelts can be used for security or posture; to make sure users never fall out of the wheelchair or for users who can not sit up straight on their own.

== Manufacturers ==
- Everest and Jennings
- Küschall
- Otto Bock
- Invacare
- TiLite
- Mogo Wheelchairs

== See also ==
- Lift chair
- Mobility scooter
- Motorized wheelchair
- Standing wheelchair
- Wheelchair accessible van
- Wheelchair DanceSport
- Wheelchair ramp
- Wheelmap.org, web mapping project (collects information worldwide about wheelchair accessibility of places)
