= Powerchair football =

Sport for people with physical disabilities

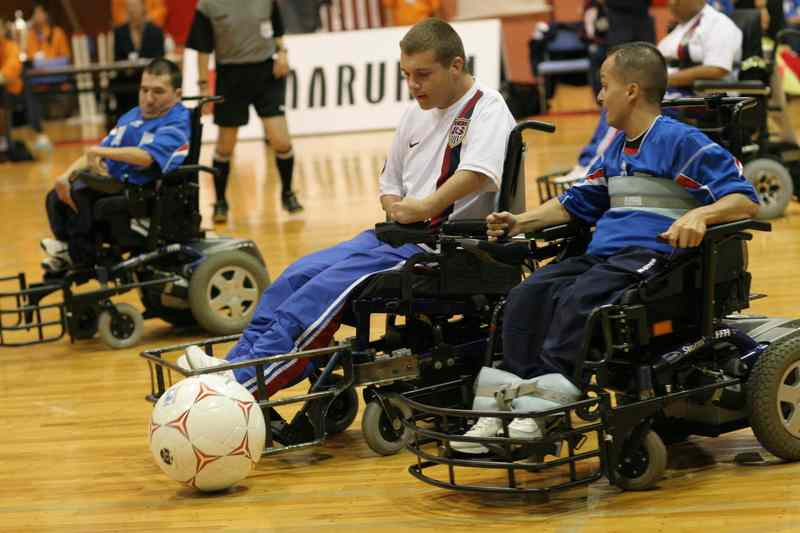
USA vs. France, FIPFA World Cup in Tokyo, October 2007

Powerchair football (French: Foot-fauteuil), also known as power soccer, is a variant of association football for people with physical disabilities. Players use specially designed powered wheelchairs in order to maneuver and kick/hit an oversized football. The game is played in a gymnasium on a regulation basketball court. Two teams of four players use powerchairs equipped with footguards to attack, defend, and spin-kick a 13-inch (330 mm) football in an attempt to score goals.

== History ==
Powerchair football was first played in France in the 1970s when teachers invented the sport as a way for students to play football even with physical disabilities. A league system with 3 divisions and 30 teams was developed along with a national championship. Canada devised a similar game called power soccer independently from France, which eventually spread to Japan. Various forms of the sport continued to develop concurrently throughout Europe and North America. It gained recognition in 1983 at the British Columbia Games for the Disabled and in 2004 by the National Disability Sports Alliance. The San Francisco Bay area and Boston area were early centers of power soccer activity in the US through the Bay Area Outreach and Recreation Program and the Massachusetts Hospital School.

While most programs played without knowledge of each other, US soccer coach David Ruelas met with the sport's French director Herve Delattre after discovering the European version of the game while in Belgium in 2004. This led to talks about forming an international organization. In January 2005, 24 representatives from 7 nations (France, United States, Canada, Japan, England, Belgium, and Portugal) met in Le Chesnay, France, to lay the foundation for forming the International Powerchair Football Association (IPFA). Their most critical objective was unifying the different rulesets present in North America, France, England, and Japan. Nine months later a second meeting was held in Coimbra, Portugal (with the inclusion of Denmark) to finalize a standardized set of rules for international play. After a presentation of the various rules and styles along with extensive discussions, the delegates decided to adopt the English rules as a template. Finally, in July 2006, in the context of an international tournament in Atlanta, Georgia, delegates finalized a constitution and changed the name of the governing body to the Federation Internationale de Powerchair Football Associations (FIPFA).

During this same timeframe the United States Power Soccer Association (USPSA) was formed with headquarters in Carmel, Indiana. Since then, numerous powerchair associations have formed and the number of teams competing within FIPFA worldwide is estimated at over 250. In 2005 the Wheelchair Football Association was founded to manage the sport in England and is sanctioned and recognized by the Football Association.

FIPFA has submitted numerous bids to the IPC in an effort to be selected as a new sport at the Paralympic Games. Powerchair football's bid for the 2016 Rio Paralympics failed in 2010. Subsequently, the sports bid for the 2020 Tokyo Paralympics was also rejected in 2015. Once again another bid was under consideration in 2019 for the 2024 Paris Paralympics but was not selected.

== Rules ==
The sport is played on a standard-sized basketball court. Each team is allowed 4 players on the court at one time including the goalkeeper. A match consists of two 20-minute periods. Because of the two-dimensional aspect of this game (players are typically unable to kick the ball into the air), artificial space has to be created around the players. The two distinct differences in the laws from association football are:

1. "2-on-1": Two players on the same team may not both be within 3 m (10 ft) of the ball when a player on the opposing team is also within 3 m of the ball. A violation of this rule results in an indirect free kick. This forces the players to spread the field and prevents clogging up of play, allowing for a greater free flow of play. An exception to this rule is if one of the two violating teammates is the goalkeeper inside their own goal area.
2. "3-in-the-goal-area": A team may only have 2 players in the goal area at once. If a third (or fourth) player enters then the referee may call a goal area violation and award an indirect free kick to the opposing team.

In the case of either of these infractions (2-on-1 or 3-in-the-area), the referee may refrain from making a call if the player in question is not affecting the play (similar to the concept of offside in association football).

Additionally, when the ball crosses the touchline, the ball is kicked directly back into play with the powerchair similar to a corner kick in association football, rather than a throw-in from the sideline. Because of this change a goal can be scored directly from a kick-in.

Intentionally striking or ramming another player may result in a penalty.

== Classification ==
FIPFA has an international classification system that ranks players according to their respective physical and psychological abilities. This is to ensure that athletes can more accurately demonstrate their sporting ability while playing and that athletes with greater physical ability do not have an unfair advantage. Classification may also determine whether a player is even allowed to play powerchair football. According to the guidelines, classification serves to determine eligibility to compete and group athletes for competition. In order to participate in the sport and get classified athletes must have a permanent, significant, and confirmed disability that is either a neurological impairment, orthopedic impairment, spinal cord injury, amputation, or myopathic disease. There are two levels of classification:

- PF1: highly significant levels of physical difficulty
- PF2: moderate to mild levels of physical difficulty
- Functional levels of skill relating to ambulation or manual wheelchair use would most likely prevent participation

Depending on the physical disability or disease players may need to be evaluated before every tournament or may only need to be evaluated once. If an impairment is not likely to change athletes have Confirmed status and only need to be reevaluated if a sudden change occurs. Otherwise, athletes whose impairment is likely to change over time must be evaluated at following events and have Review status.

During a match a team may only have a maximum of two PF2 classified players on the court at once. Within the rostered team itself there can be any combination of classifications. If a violation of this rule occurs, the team in noncompliance must rectify the situation at the next stoppage and a penalty will be awarded to the opposing team. If an appropriate combination of players is not available the penalized team must play with one less player.

== Equipment ==
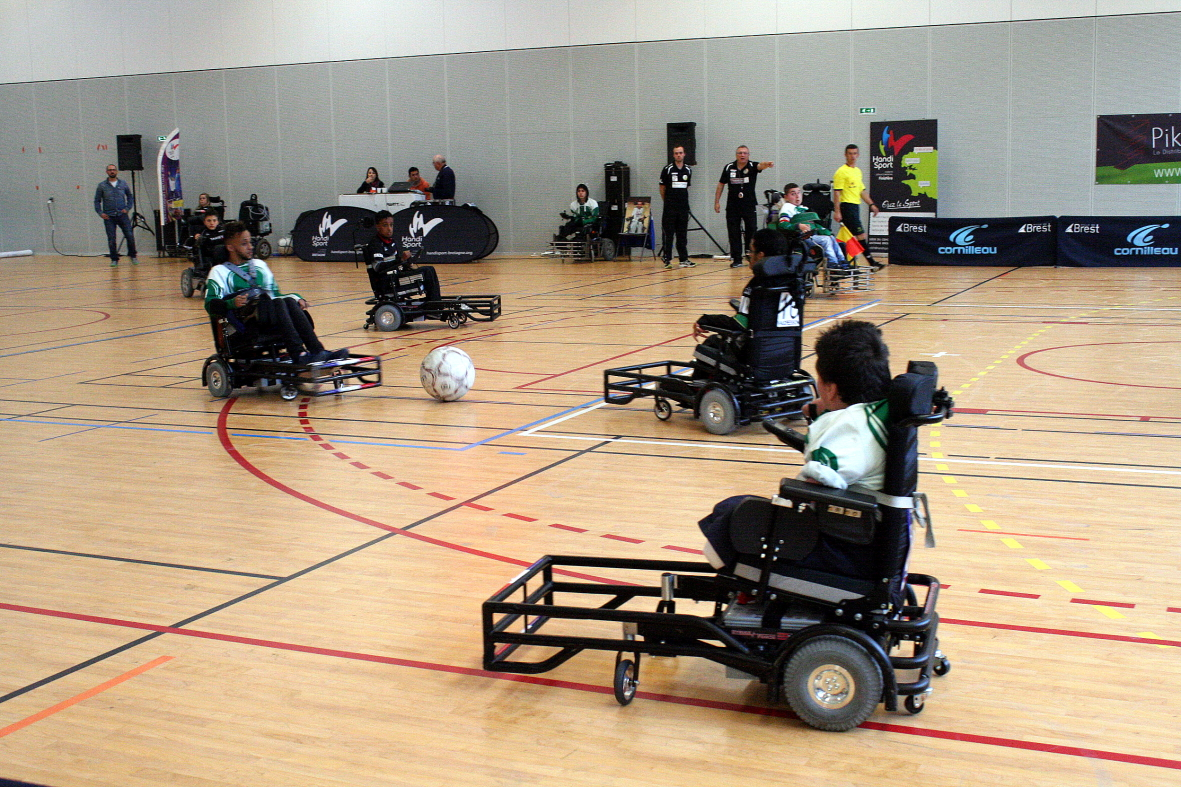
Players in Brest, France, using Strikeforces during the 2014 French Division 1 Championship

Players are required to use a powerchair with 4 or more wheels. The maximum allowable speed during a match is 10 km/h (6.2 mph), and the referees will inspect the players' speed before the match begins. A lap belt and foot guard are also required equipment. The ball is an oversized soccer ball, 13 inches (33 cm) in diameter.

In 2012, the first power wheelchair specifically designed for powerchair football was introduced. Named the Strike Force, it has a longer foot guard and wheels that are set further apart. It is also far more responsive than older powerchairs. The Strike Force is made in Minnesota by the Power Soccer Shop. Its use has extended to Asia, Europe, and the Americas.

== FIPFA ==
FIPFA (Fédération Internationale de Powerchair Football Association) was established in 2006 to govern the sport and is headquartered in Paris, France.

== Events ==
=== FIPFA World Cup ===
The first FIPFA World Cup was held in Tokyo, Japan in October 2007. The final was played on 13 October, with the United States beating France in a penalty shootout after drawing 1-1 during regulation and extra time. Belgium outlasted Japan and won on penalties to earn third place.

The second FIPFA World Cup was held November 2011 in Paris. The final was played on 6 November, with the United States beating England 3–0 in regulation. This was the first US team to win back-to-back world championships in football. France took third place after beating Belgium.

The third World Cup was held in 2017 in Kissimmee, Florida. The final was played on 9 July, with France beating the United States 4–2 in regulation. England bested Australia to take third place. Australian Abdullah Karim won the Most Valuable Player award.

The fourth World Cup opened in Sydney, Australia on 15 October 2023. It was originally scheduled for 2021 but was delayed until October 2022 due to the COVID-19 pandemic. In April 2022, with the continuation of the pandemic, the World Cup was postponed for another year until 2023. The final was played on 20 October, with France and England drawing 1–1 in regulation, before France won on penalties 2–1. The United States beat Argentina 2–1 to take third place. Mohamed Ghelami from the French national team was awarded with both the Player of the Tournament and Golden Guard.

FIPFA World Cup Rankings
	1st	2nd	3rd	4th
Tokyo 2007	United States	France	Belgium	Japan
Paris 2011	United States	England	France	Belgium
Kissimmee 2017	France	United States	England	Australia
Sydney 2023	France	England	United States	Argentina
Buenos Aires 2026	France	England	United States	Argentina

=== APFC Copas and Champions Cup ===
The first Americas Champions Cup was held in Atlanta, Georgia in October 2009 between the top US and Canadian club teams with Atlanta Synergy winning the competition. Atlanta Synergy also won the 2010 Americas Champions Cup defeating Tampa Thunder 4–0 in the final and confirming an undefeated run at the tournament in Burnaby, Canada.

The first Copa Americas (or Mundialito de Power Soccer) tournament was hosted in Rio de Janeiro, Brazil between 2–4 May 2014. The national teams of Argentina, Brazil, Canada, Uruguay, the United States, and Australia played for the Americas championship. The US team won in the final, beating Australia 6–0. Canada secured third place after beating Brazil 3–2.

Rio de Janeiro, Brazil hosted the 2019 APFC Americas Cup which determined qualification for the 2022 FIPFA World Cup. The United States, Canada, Argentina, Brazil and Uruguay participated with the top three qualifying. In the final the US beat Uruguay 5–1 with a hat trick contribution by Michael Archer. Argentina came in third place to round out the qualification slots.

=== EPFA Nations and Champions Cup ===
In July 2014, six nations (Belgium, Denmark, England, France, Ireland and Switzerland) participated in the EPFA Nations Cup. The event was held at the University of Limerick in Ireland, with the top five teams qualifying for the 2017 FIPFA World Cup. The only team not to qualify was bottom place finisher Switzerland. France won the tournament by beating England 5–0 in the final.

In October 2016, an EPFA Champions Cup was held in Hou, Denmark between ten club teams. These teams were from England, France, Ireland, and Denmark. The final took place on the 20 October with the French team Auch beating the English team West Bromwich Albion 3–0.

In October 2018, the EPFA Champions Cup was held once again in Hou, Denmark. Club teams participated from the same four countries as 2016. In an all French final, Grafteaux defeated the defending champions Auch 1–0.

In May 2019 the second EPFA Nations Cup event was held in Pajulahti, Finland. Seven nations (Austria, Denmark, England, Finland, France, Northern Ireland and the Republic of Ireland) from across Europe competed to become Europe's top ranked national team and qualify for five available slots in the 2022 FIPFA World Cup. The final was contested between England and France and went to penalties after the match ended 2–2 after extra time. England won on penalties with Marcus Harrison scoring the winning penalty.

The 2020 EPFA Champions Cup was scheduled to take place in Geneva, Switzerland in August 2020. A number of club teams represented countries that had not sent a team before including teams from Scotland, Austria, and Finland. Due to the COVID-19 pandemic, however, the tournament was postponed.

== See also ==
- United States Power Soccer Association
- Wheelchair football (American)
