= FIPFA =

International governing body of powerchair football

FIPFA logo

FIPFA, the Fédération Internationale de Powerchair Football Association, is the international governing body of powerchair football. It is headquartered in Paris, France.

In 2006, representatives of 9 nations met in Coimbra in Portugal and then in Atlanta in the United States to develop a standardized set of laws for the game and to form and international governing body.

== Organization ==
FIPFA is governed by an Executive Council with 10 members, each elected for 4 years. The President supervises the proposals put forth by commissions that work together for the development of the discipline throughout the world.

FIPFA is organized similar to FIFA, with several international zones. Currently, the only organized zone is the European Powerchair Football Association (EPFA), although the Powerchair Football Conference of the Americas (PFCA) is currently in the process of being organized. Eventually, the goal is to have zones for Asia and Africa as well.

== Members ==
Member Countries
| Country | Membership | Zone |
|---|---|---|
| Argentina | 2013 | APFC |
| Australia | 2011 | APO |
| Austria | 2014 | EPFA |
| Belgium* | 2006 | EPFA |
| Brazil | 2011 | APFC |
| Canada* | 2006 | APFC |
| Denmark* | 2006 | EPFA |
| England* | 2006 | EPFA |
| Finland | 2013 | EPFA |
| France* | 2006 | EPFA |
| Germany | 2017 | EPFA |
| Hong Kong | Identified | APO |
| India | 2017 | APO |
| Ireland | 2010 | EPFA |
| Italy | Identified | EPFA |
| Japan* | 2006 | APO |
| Mexico | 2018 | APFC |
| New Zealand | 2017 | APO |
| Northern Ireland | 2023 | EPFA |
| Poland | 2010 | EPFA |
| Portugal* | 2006 | EPFA |
| Scotland | 2010 | EPFA |
| Singapore | 2010 | APO |
| South Korea* | 2006 | APO |
| Spain | 2014 | EPFA |
| Switzerland | 2009 | EPFA |
| Turkey | 2017 | EPFA |
| United States* | 2006 | APFC |
| Uruguay | 2014 | APFC |
| Wales | Identified | EPFA |

(* denotes Founding member, non-members with identified interest also listed)

== World Cup ==
There are competitions every four years. The first World Cup competition was hosted in Japan in 2007, and was won by the US National Team. The US team successfully defended its title in Paris in 2011. The following FIPFA World Cup was hosted in the US in July 2017 and was won by France.
