= Soccer in the United States =

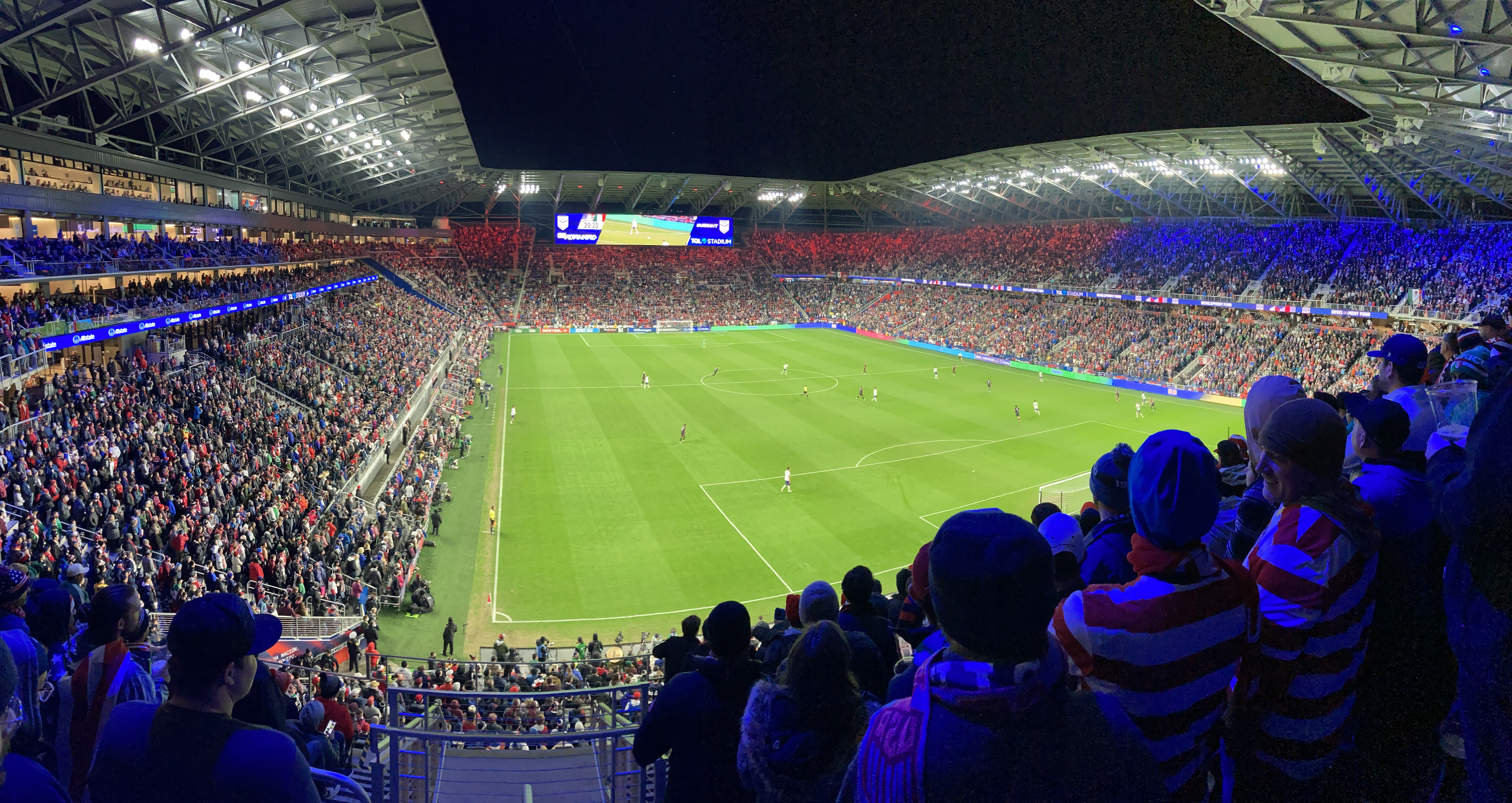
- The USMNT playing at TQL Stadium in 2021
- Country: United States
- Governing body: U.S. Soccer
- National teams: Men's; Women's
- First played: 1869; 157 years ago
- Registered players: 4,186,778
- Clubs: 9,000

National competitions
- U.S. Open Cup (men's)

Club competitions
- List: Men's: Major League Soccer (Division I) USL Championship (Division II) USL League One (Division III) USL Cup (Division II & III) National Independent Soccer Association (Division III) MLS Next Pro (Division III) USL League Two (Semi–pro) National Premier Soccer League (Semi-pro) NISA Nation (Semi-pro) United Premier Soccer League (Semi-pro) Women's: National Women's Soccer League (Division I) NWSL Challenge Cup (Division I) USL Super League (Division I) United Women's Soccer (Semi-pro) USL W League (Semi-pro)

International competitions
- List: Men's clubs: CONCACAF Champions Cup Campeones Cup Leagues Cup FIFA Intercontinental Cup FIFA Club World Cup Women's clubs: CONCACAF W Champions Cup NWSL x Liga MX Femenil Summer Cup FIFA Women's Champions Cup FIFA Women's Club World Cup Men's national team: CONCACAF Gold Cup CONCACAF Nations League FIFA World Cup Women's national team: SheBelieves Cup CONCACAF Olympic Qualifying Tournament CONCACAF W Championship CONCACAF W Gold Cup FIFA Women's World Cup

Audience records
- Single match: List: Men's: 109,318 (Man. United 3–1 Real Madrid at Michigan Stadium, 2014) Women's: 90,185 (USA 5–4 (pen.) China at the Rose Bowl, 1999)
- Season: List: Men's: 88,210 (LA Galaxy 2–1 LAFC) at the Rose Bowl, 2023 Women's: 63,004 (Denver Summit FC 0–0 Washington Spirit) at Empower Field at Mile High, 2026

Soccer is the fourth most popular sport in the United States behind American football, basketball, and baseball, respectively. 27% of U.S. sports fans show an interest in soccer.

The United States Soccer Federation (USSF) governs most levels of soccer in the United States, including the national teams, professional leagues, and amateur leagues, being the highest soccer authority in the country. The National Collegiate Athletic Association (NCAA) governs most colleges, Although the second level under that at the collegiate level is the NJCAA (National Junior College Athletic Association), which governs two-year college athletics which serve as a pathway for many students to transfer to four-year NCAA schools later. Secondary schools are governed by state-level associations, with the National Federation of State High School Associations (NFHS) setting the rules at that level. The match regulations are generally the same between the three governing bodies although there are many subtle differences.

In 2017, Gallup reported that soccer was the third-most watched team sport in the U.S., behind only basketball and American football.

The highest-level of men's professional soccer in the United States is Major League Soccer (MLS). The league's predecessor was the major professional North American Soccer League (NASL), which existed from 1968 until 1984. MLS began to play in 1996 with 10 teams and has grown to 30 teams (27 in the United States and 3 in Canada). The MLS season runs from February to November, with the regular-season winner awarded the Supporters' Shield and the post-season winner awarded the MLS Cup. With an average attendance of over 20,000 per game, MLS has the third-highest average attendance of any sports league in the United States after the National Football League (NFL) and Major League Baseball (MLB), and is the seventh-highest attended professional soccer league worldwide. MLS uses franchised clubs similar to other major American sports leagues, rather than the promotion and relegation model used for club soccer in European nations.

The first women's professional soccer league in the United States was formed by Tracey Higgins after the success of the 1999 Women's World Cup. The Women's United Soccer Association (WUSA) ran from 2001 to 2003 and featured many of the World Cup stars, including Mia Hamm, Michelle Akers and Brandi Chastain. Its successor Women's Professional Soccer (WPS) ran from 2009 to 2012. Currently, the National Women's Soccer League (NWSL) and the USL Super League are the top professional leagues in the country; the NWSL was formed in 2012 with play starting in 2013, and the USL Super League began play in 2024. The NWSL season runs from spring to early fall (typically April – October), while the USL Super League plays the traditional fall to spring schedule (August - June).

American soccer fans follow the American national teams in international competition. The 2015 FIFA Women's World Cup final drew a record 26.7 million viewers, greater than the final games of the 2014 World Series or the 2015 NBA Finals, and the 2026 Men's World Cup final drew 62.8 million viewers. The women's national team has won four Women's World Cup titles and five gold medals at the Summer Olympics and the men's national team played in every World Cup from 1990 to 2014 and returned to the World Cup in 2022.

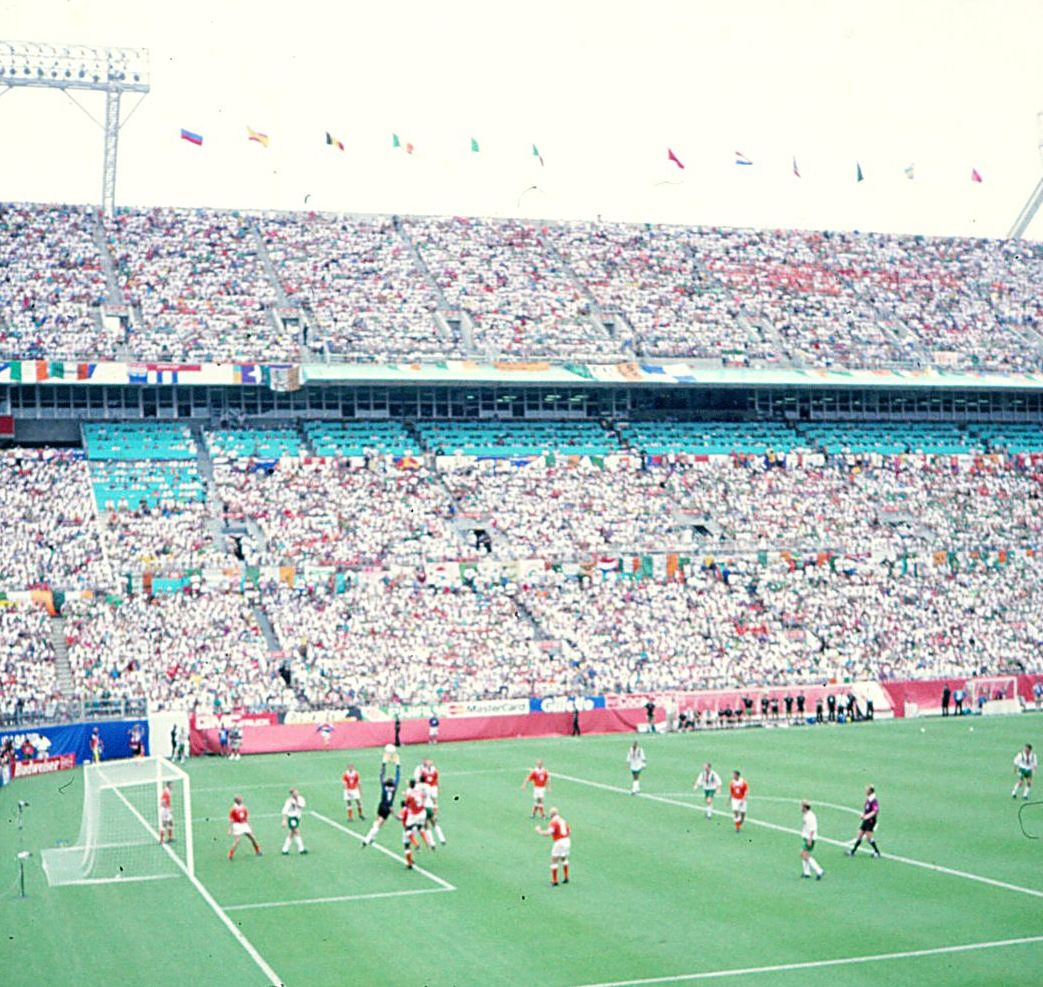
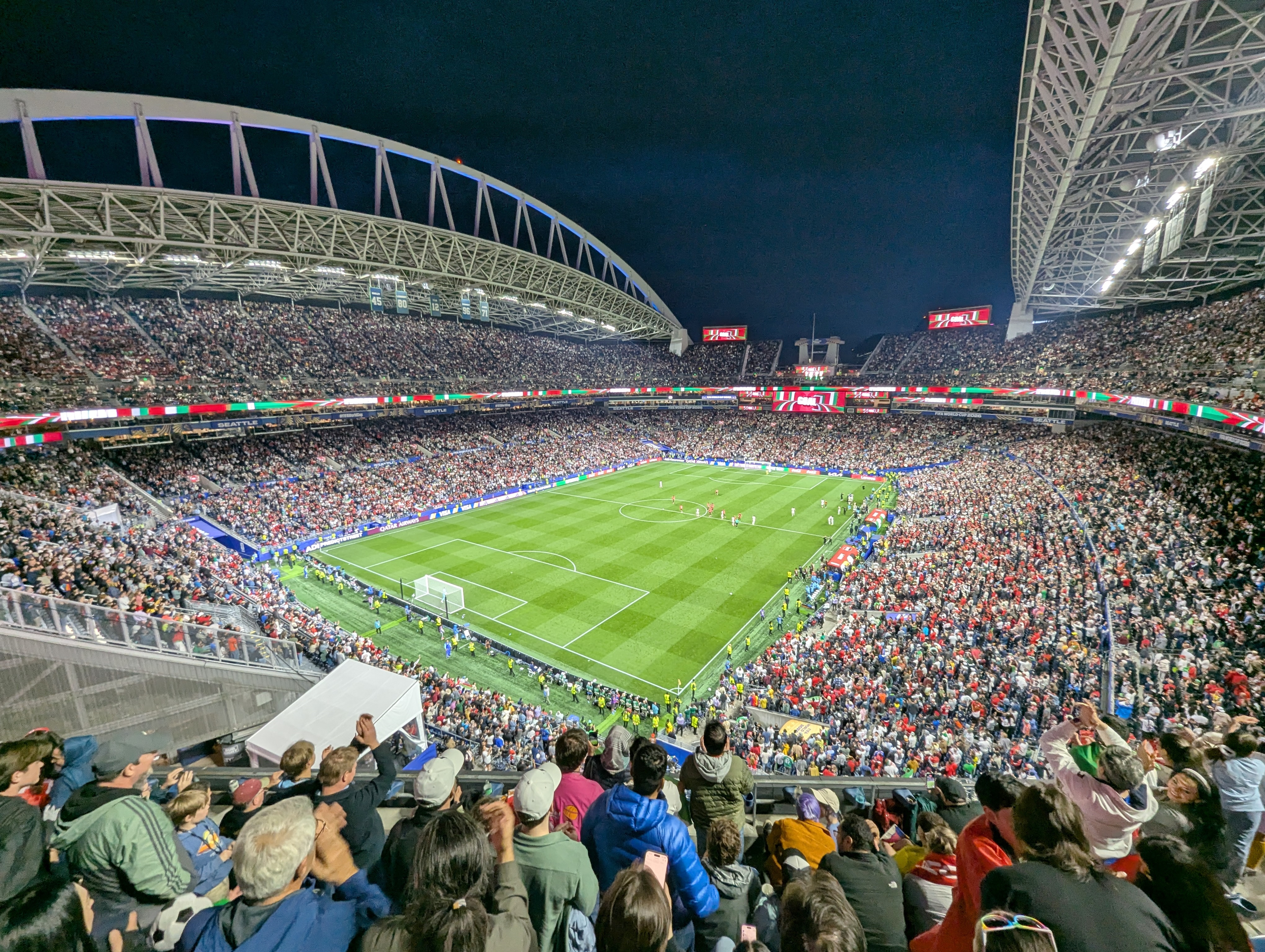
(Left): A game between Ireland and the Netherlands in Orlando at the 1994 FIFA World Cup; (Right): Iran and Egypt playing at the 2026 FIFA World Cup in Seattle.

The United States has hosted numerous major international association football tournaments, including the FIFA World Cup in 1994 and 2026, the Copa América in 2016 and 2024, the FIFA Club World Cup in 2025 and will host the first edition of the FIFA Women's Club World Cup in 2028. The country has also hosted every CONCACAF Gold Cup since the tournament's inception in 1991, either as host or co-host. In women's football, the United States hosted the FIFA Women's World Cup in 1999 and 2003. Additionally, the United States hosted the Olympic football tournaments at the 1984 Summer Olympics in Los Angeles, the 1996 Summer Olympics in Atlanta (including the inaugural Olympic women's tournament), and will host the football competition at the upcoming 2028 Summer Olympics in Los Angeles.

== Terminology ==
In the United States, the sport of association football is mainly referred to as "soccer" (Originally an abbreviation for the British slang term, "associationer"), as the term "football" is primarily used to refer to the sport of American football.

== History ==
=== Beginnings and decline: 1850s–1930s ===
There has been some debate about the origins of modern soccer in the United States. It has long been held that the modern game entered the States through Ellis Island in the 1860s. However, 2013 research has shown that soccer entered America through the port of New Orleans, as Irish, English, Scottish, Italian and German immigrants brought the game with them. It was in New Orleans that many of the first games of soccer in America were held.

Oneida Football Club has been named as the first association football club in the United States but there is still discussion on what rules the club used, and it broke up within the space of a few years. According to Encyclopædia Britannica, the club is often credited with inventing the "Boston Game", which allowed players to both kick a round ball along the ground, and to pick it up and run with it. On the other hand, in 1869, Princeton and Rutgers played the first intercollegiate football game. Although each team had 25 players, the use of a soccer ball and the rules based on the 1863 London Football Association laws arguably make it the first college soccer match and the birth of soccer in the United States.

Nevertheless, the earliest known game of organized soccer in the United States was played on October 11, 1866 in Waukesha, Wisconsin under the 1863 London Football Association laws.

The earliest examples of governance in the sport started in 1884 when the American Football Association (AFA) was incarnated. The AFA sought to standardize rules for the local soccer teams based in the Northeastern United States, particularly in northern New Jersey and southern New York state. By 1886, the AFA had spread in influence into Pennsylvania and Massachusetts.

Within a year of its founding, the AFA organized the first non-league cup in American soccer history, known as the American Cup. For the first dozen years, clubs from New Jersey and Massachusetts dominated the competition. It would not be until 1897 that a club from outside those two states won the American Cup. Philadelphia Manz brought the title to Pennsylvania for the first time. Due to conflicts within the AFA, the cup was suspended in 1899, and it was not resumed until 1906.

Early soccer leagues in the U.S. mostly used the name "football", for example: the AFA (founded in 1884), the American Amateur Football Association (1893), the American League of Professional Football (1894), the National Association Foot Ball League (1895), and the Southern New England Football League (1914). Common confusion between the terms American football and association football eventually led to a more domestic widespread use of the term soccer with regard to association football. Originally seen as a British slang term for "association", the use of soccer began appearing in the late 1910s and early 1920s. A noticeable example was the American Soccer League (ASL), which formed in 1919. The governing body of the sport in the U.S. did not have the word soccer in its name until 1945 when it became the United States Soccer Football Association. It did not drop the word football from its name until 1974, when it became the United States Soccer Federation, often going simply as U.S. Soccer.

In October 1911, a competing body, the American Amateur Football Association (AAFA) was created. The association quickly spread outside of the Northeast and created its own cup in 1912, the American Amateur Football Association Cup.

The conflicts within the AFA led to a movement to create a truly national body to oversee American soccer. In 1913, both the AAFA and AFA applied for membership in FIFA, the international governing body for soccer. Drawing on both its position as the oldest soccer organization and the status of the American Cup, the AFA argued that it should be the nationally recognized body. Later that year, the AAFA gained an edge over the AFA when several AFA organizations moved to the AAFA.

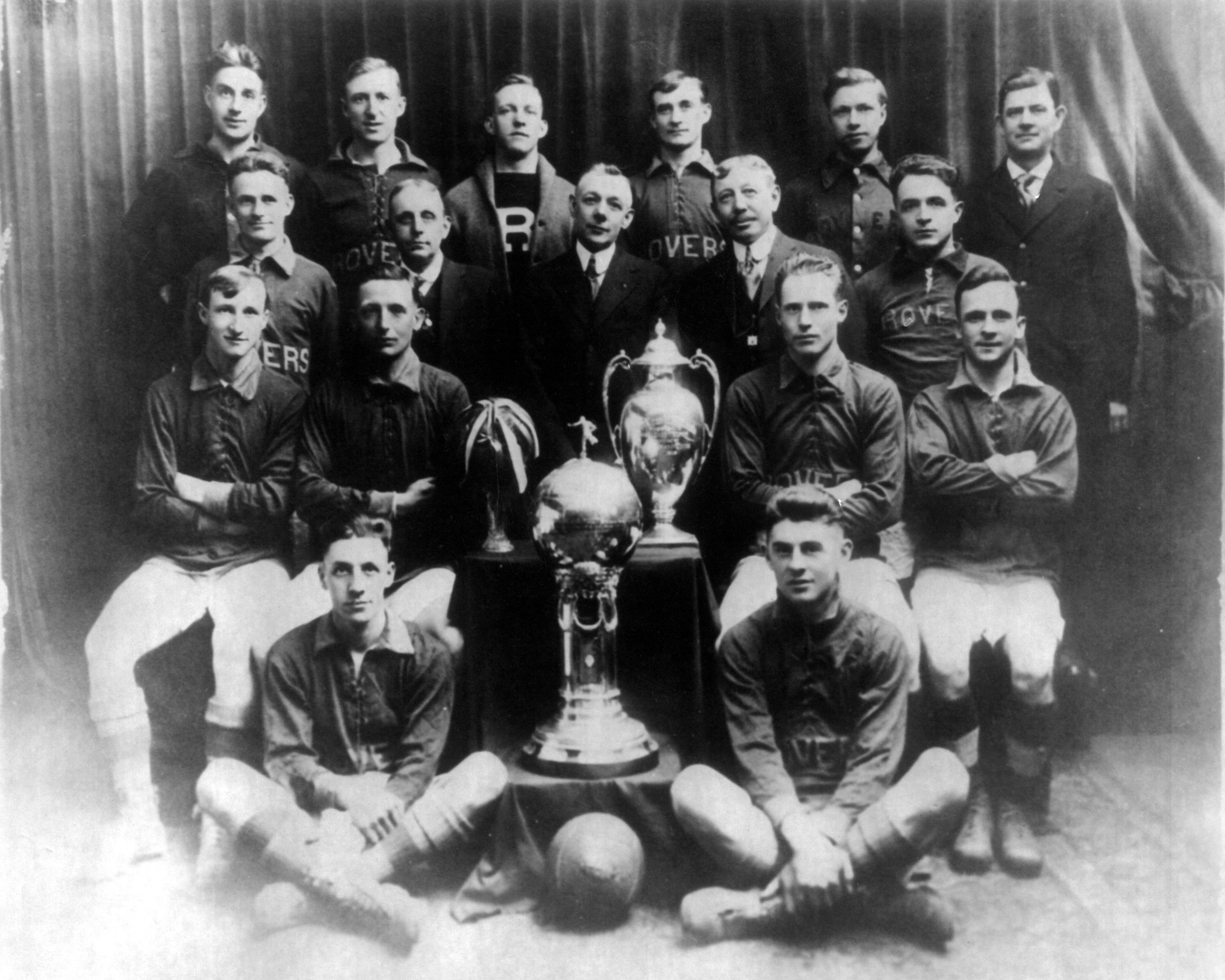
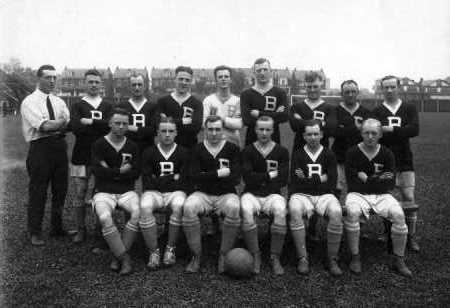
(Left): The 1917 Fall River Rovers were among the few clubs to win both the National Challenge Cup and the American Cup; (right): Bethlehem Steel (of Pennsylvania) team in July 1921

On April 5, 1913, the AAFA reorganized as the United States Football Association (USFA), presently known as the United States Soccer Federation. FIFA quickly granted a provisional membership and USFA began exerting its influence on the sport. This led to the establishment of the National Challenge Cup, which still exists as the Lamar Hunt U.S. Open Cup, that fall. The National Challenge Cup quickly grew to overshadow the American Cup. However, both cups were played simultaneously for the next ten years. Declining respect for the AFA led to the withdrawal of several associations from its cup in 1917. Further competition came in 1924 when USFA created the National Amateur Cup. That spelled the death knell for the American Cup. It played its last season in 1924.

During the days of the American Soccer League, the league was seen as widely popular, and considered to be the second-most popular sports league in the United States, only behind Major League Baseball. However, the "soccer war" between the USFA and ASL, combined with the onset of the Great Depression in 1929, led to the demise of the ASL in 1933, and the demise of the professional sport in the United States; Most will argue that soccer struggled to gain popularity in the United States because the country's “sports space” had already been dominated by baseball, American football, basketball, and ice hockey by the early 20th century, however, the sport continued in amateur and semi-professional leagues. The national soccer team competed in the first two FIFA World Cups, managing to qualify for the semifinals of the first tournament and qualifying for the following one in Italy, where the U.S. team was knocked out in the first match by would-be world champions Italy.

=== Re-emergence and growth: 1960s–today ===
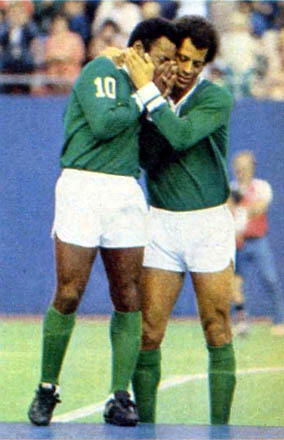
Pelé crying while teammate Carlos Alberto consoles him, at the end of his speech during Pelé's farewell match, October 1977 (New York Cosmos)

The prominence of college soccer increased with the NCAA sanctioning an annual men's soccer championship, beginning in 1959 with the inaugural championship won by Saint Louis University.

Two professional soccer leagues were started in 1967, the United Soccer Association (USA) and the National Professional Soccer League (NPSL), which merged to form the North American Soccer League (NASL) in 1968. The NASL enjoyed a significant boost in popularity when the New York Cosmos signed Pelé to play for three seasons in 1975–77. The Cosmos drew large publicity throughout the late 1970s. Between 1977 and 1980, the Cosmos drew crowds of more than 60,000 on ten occasions, and over 70,000 on seven occasions (see Record attendances in United States club soccer). The NASL declined during the early 1980s and disbanded in 1984 amidst financial problems. The popularity of indoor soccer peaked in the 1980s, with both the NASL and the Major Indoor Soccer League operating indoor soccer leagues.

The 1970s and 1980s saw increased popularity of the college game. Women's college soccer received a significant boost in 1972 with the passage of Title IX, which mandated equal funding for women's athletic programs, leading to colleges forming NCAA-sanctioned women's varsity teams. A men's match between Saint Louis University and local rival SIU Edwardsville drew a college record 22,512 fans to Busch Stadium on October 30, 1980. By 1984, more colleges played soccer (532) than American football (505).

In 1967 there were 100,000 people playing soccer in the US; by 1984, that number had grown to over 4 million. Girls high school soccer experienced tremendous growth in playing numbers throughout the 1970s and 1980s—from 10,000 in 1976 to 41,000 in 1980, to 122,000 in 1990.

The soccer matches for the 1984 Summer Olympics were well attended. Five matches drew over 75,000 fans, and two soccer matches at the Rose Bowl stadium in Pasadena, California, drew over 100,000 fans. In 1904, soccer was included in the Summer Olympics in St. Louis, where two American club teams won the silver and bronze medals. These high attendance figures were one factor that FIFA took into consideration in 1988 when deciding to award the 1994 World Cup to the United States.

Interest in soccer within the United States continued to grow during the 1990s. This growth has been attributed in significant part to the FIFA World Cup being held in the United States for the first time in 1994. This won the sport more attention from both the media and casual sports fans. The tournament was successful, drawing an average attendance of 68,991, a World Cup record that still stands today. The 1994 World Cup drew record TV audiences in the U.S.

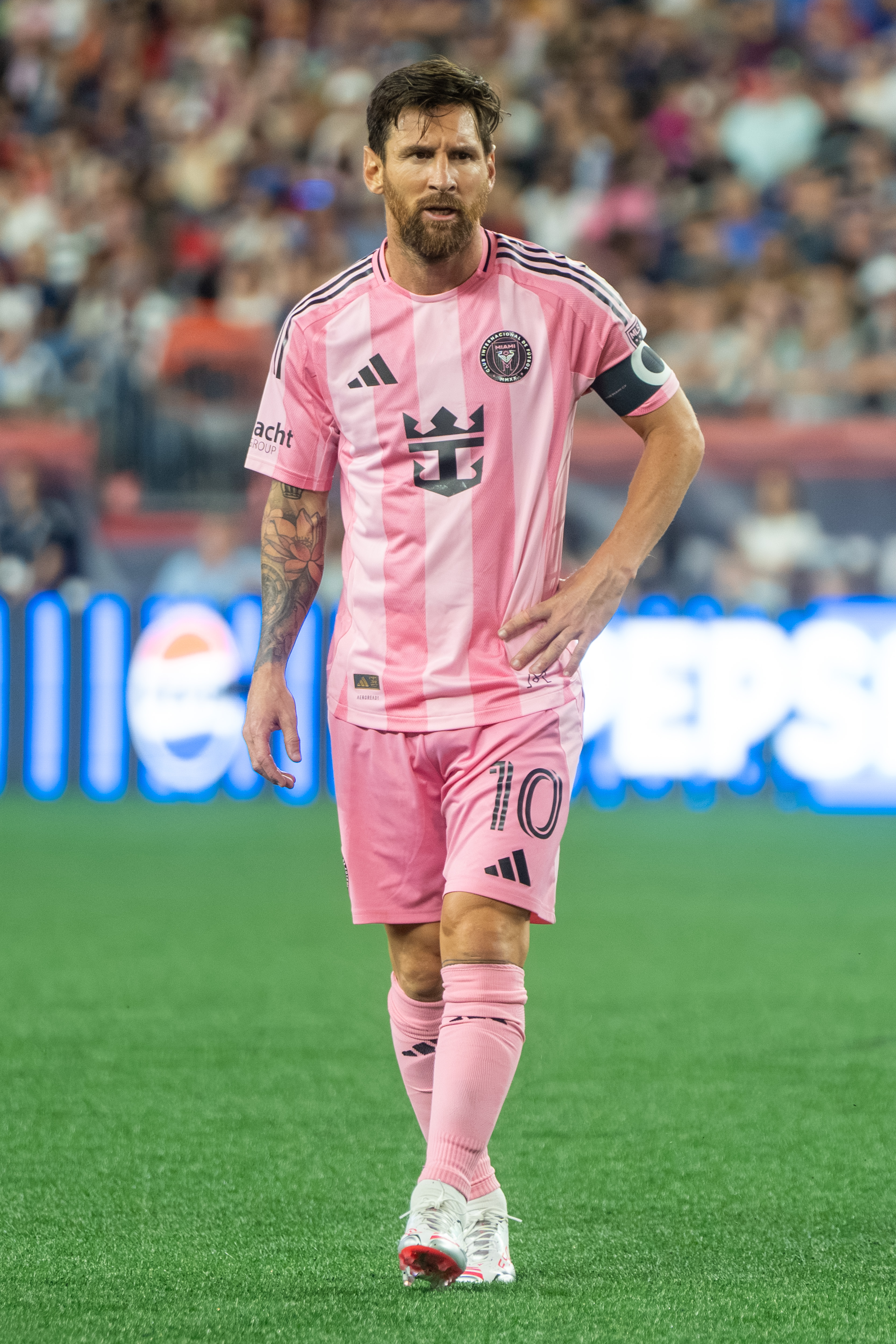
Lionel Messi, regarded as one of the greatest soccer/football players in history playing for MLS team Inter Miami in 2025.

As part of the United States' bid to host the 1994 World Cup, U.S. Soccer pledged to create a professional outdoor league. Major League Soccer (MLS) launched in 1996, which helped develop American players in a way that was not possible without a domestic league. Many of these players competed in the 2002 FIFA World Cup, where the United States reached the quarterfinals, its best result in the modern era. The team qualified for seven consecutive World Cup tournaments between 1990 and 2014 before failing to qualify for the 2018 tournament, the first since 1986. The USMNT would return at the 2022 FIFA World Cup, where they managed to repeat their performances of 2010 and 2014 editions.

The growth of the women's game during the 1990s helped increase overall interest in soccer in the United States. The number of women's college soccer teams increased from 318 in 1991 to 959 in 2009. Both the 1999 and 2003 FIFA Women's World Cups were held in the United States. The crowd of over 90,000 at the Rose Bowl for the 1999 FIFA Women's World Cup Final remained the largest crowd in the world to witness any women's sporting event for more than 20 years.

== Popularity ==
As of 2006, there were approximately 4.2 million players (2.5 million male and 1.7 million female) registered with U.S. Soccer. As of 2012, thirty percent of American households contain someone playing soccer, a figure second only to baseball.

Increasing numbers of Americans, having played the game in their youth, are now avid spectators. The annual ESPN sports poll has shown soccer as the fourth most popular team sport in the United States every year since overtaking hockey in 2006. A 2012 Harris Interactive poll showed soccer to be the fifth favorite team sport, with 2% of Americans ranking soccer as their favorite (compared to 5% for ice hockey). A 2011 ESPN sports poll ranked soccer as the second most popular sport in the country for 12- to 24-year-olds. In 2013, Lionel Messi became the first soccer player ever to rank among the Top 10 most popular athletes in the U.S. in an ESPN poll, although he was not listed in the Top 10 in a Harris poll. A 2017 poll by Gallup found that soccer is nearly as popular as baseball with 7% of Americans saying it is their favorite sport, as opposed to 9% for baseball.

=== Competitions and attendance ===
Record men's soccer attendances in the U.S.
Attendance	Event	Teams	Stadium	Ref.
109,318	2014 ICC	Man. Utd. 3–1 R. Madrid	Michigan Stadium	
105,826	2016 ICC	R. Madrid 3–2 Chelsea	Michigan Stadium	
101,799	1984 Olympics	France 2–0 Brazil	Rose Bowl	
101,254	2018 ICC	Man. Utd. 1–4 Liverpool	Michigan Stadium	
100,374	1984 Olympics	Yugoslavia 2–1 Italy	Rose Bowl	
97,451	1984 Olympics	France 4–2 Yugoslavia	Rose Bowl	
94,194	1994 World Cup	Brazil 0–0 Italy	Rose Bowl	

Record women's soccer attendances in the U.S.
Attendance	Event	Teams	Stadium	Ref.
90,185	1999 World Cup	USA 5–4 (pk) China	Rose Bowl	
78,972	1999 World Cup	USA 3–0 Denmark	Giants Stadium	
76,489	1996 Olympics	USA 2–1 China	Sanford Stadium	
73,123	1999 World Cup	USA 2–0 Brazil	Stanford Stadium	
65,080	1999 World Cup	USA 7–1 Nigeria	Soldier Field	
65,080	1996 Olympics	USA 2–1 (ot) Norway	Sanford Stadium	
64,196	1996 Olympics	USA 3–0 Denmark	Citrus Bowl	

Many soccer matches in the United States draw large crowds, particularly international matches. A 2014 International Champions Cup match between Real Madrid and Manchester United at Michigan Stadium in Ann Arbor, Michigan had an attendance of 109,318, a record crowd for a U.S. soccer match.

The 2009 Gold Cup quarterfinal matches drew over 82,000 to Cowboys Stadium (now known as AT&T Stadium). Between 2008 and 2011, the U.S. played three times in East Rutherford, New Jersey, drawing over 78,000 fans each game. The United States and Mexico national teams have been playing in front of crowds in excess of 60,000 in the U.S. in recent years.

Also in recent years, many top-division European clubs—such as English clubs Manchester United and Chelsea, and Spanish clubs Real Madrid and Barcelona—have spent portions of their pre-season summer schedule playing matches in the United States. These matches have been highly attended events for U.S. stadiums. The 2009 World Football Challenge drew large crowds around the country, and Chelsea's four-game stint in the United States drew record crowds for a visiting foreign team.

Nations from other regions have decided to organize tournaments in the U.S., given the growing soccer market in the country. For example, the 2014 Copa Centroamericana, a soccer competition for countries from Central America, was held in the U.S., due to the commercial appeal of the U.S. soccer market. Similarly, the 2016 Copa América was also held in the U.S., marking the first time that tournament took place outside of South America. The U.S. was selected to host for financial reasons, because "the market is in the United States, the stadiums are in the United States ... everything is in the United States".

Furthermore, several nations schedule friendly matches to be held in the U.S. against opponents other than the U.S. national team. For example, the Mexico national team usually schedules several friendlies in the U.S. each year against various opponents. The El Salvador national team also regularly plays friendlies in the U.S., often in the Washington, D.C. area, home to a large Salvadoran community. The Brazil, Argentina, and Colombia national teams also play matches in the U.S. This is due to the fact that the U.S. has more adequate venues for competitions.

The 2018 MLS cup final recorded an attendance of 73,019, beating the past record of 61,316 which was set in the 2002 cup final. At the time, this was the most-attended MLS game in history. The most recent attendance record for an MLS match was set on March 5, 2022, when 74,479 fans attended Charlotte FC's inaugural home match at Bank of America Stadium. That record was subsequently broken on July 4, 2023 when a crowd of 82,110 attended an El Trafico derby between LA Galaxy and Los Angeles Football Club at the Rose Bowl.

=== Regional popularity ===
The popularity of the sport varies from region to region, and sometimes from city to city. Atlanta, Charlotte, and Seattle are known to draw stadium attendances of more than 35,000 frequently (with Atlanta drawing 70,000+ occasionally). Additionally, it has the highest city professional sports attendance per game in Portland and Orlando, albeit at just over 20,000 spectators; while Cincinnati drew tier 2 attendances comparable to 2. Bundesliga in Germany before getting invited to Major League Soccer.

In the rest of the United States, the situation varies. The sport has struggled to get a big break in New York City and Chicago, with the latter's Chicago Fire FC having had the lowest average attendance in Major League Soccer in 2019 at 12,324. California is strongly represented with teams in most professional and semi-pro leagues, but lag behind in Major League Soccer attendance. In bigger states and cities (especially the Northeast and California), the international club game is far more popular than MLS or USL, both in terms of crowds and TV ratings.

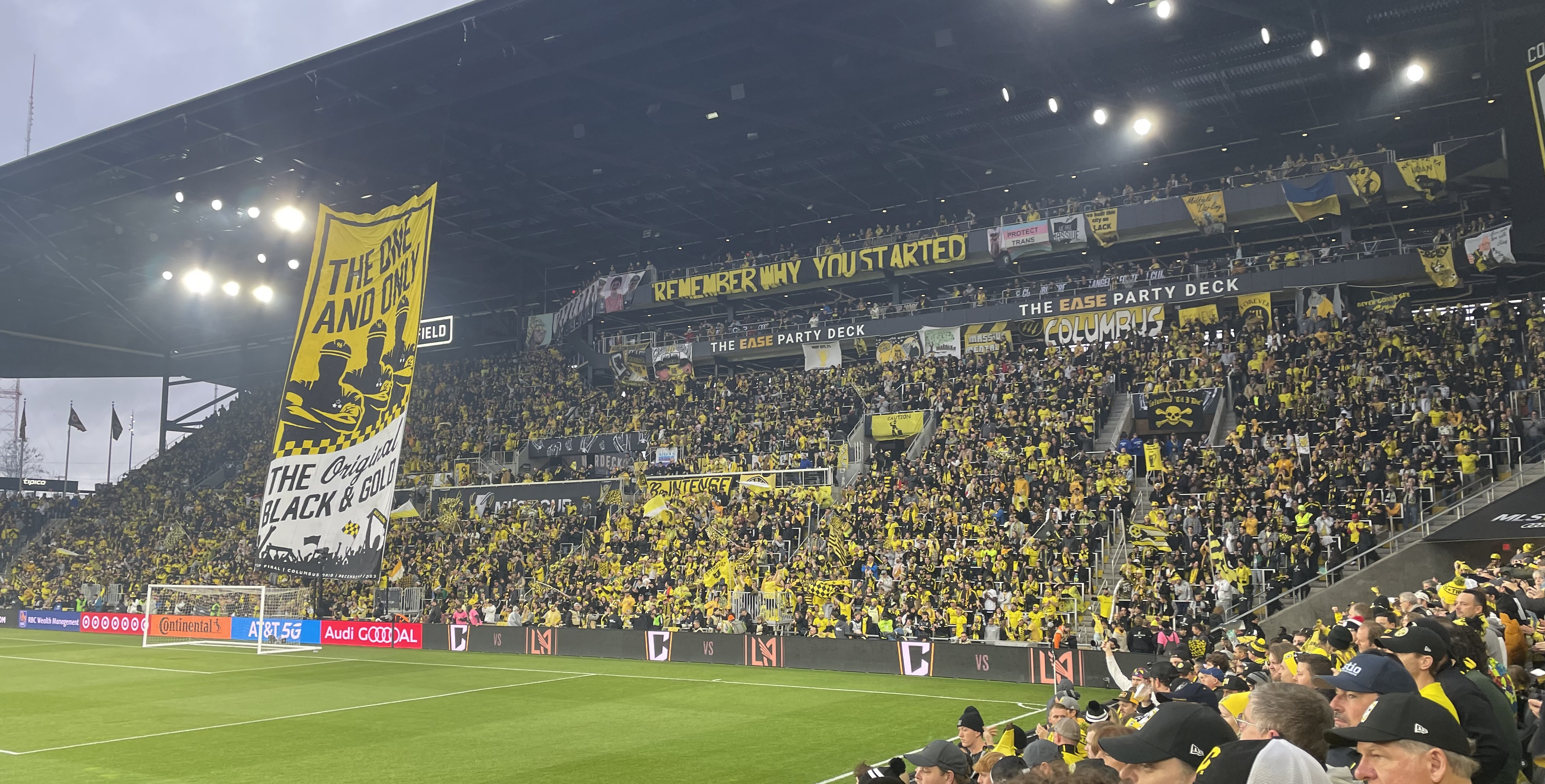
Columbus Crew fans in 2023

Professional senior teams are almost non-existent in the Prairie and Rockie states north of Omaha (Sioux Falls Thunder FC in Sioux Falls, South Dakota play in the tier 4 National Premier Soccer League as of August 2023), and entirely non-existent in Hawaii. National under-23 collegiate amateur leagues and intrastate adult/junior leagues are held in those regions, however. In Alaska, the semi-pro Last Frontier Conference at approximately tier 5 forms part of United Premier Soccer League.

International club friendlies have frequently drawn more spectators than most US-based teams' league matches, including in areas not otherwise represented by major national clubs, e.g. Michigan and Maryland. The 2014 International Champions Cup match between Manchester United and Real Madrid drew 109,318 spectators to Michigan Stadium.

== Women's professional soccer ==
Women's soccer in the United States has been played at the professional level since 2001. Women's soccer has made a significant impact all over the U.S. They have gotten support, rejection, and discrimination, and have battled for equal rights in a male-dominated soccer environment.

=== WUSA (2001–2003) ===
As a result of the U.S. women's national team's (USWNT) first-place showing in the 1999 FIFA Women's World Cup, a seemingly viable market for the sport germinated. Feeding on the momentum of their victory, the eight-team league formed in February 2000, the U.S. Soccer Federation approved membership of the Women's United Soccer Association (WUSA) as a sanctioned Division 1 women's professional soccer league on August 18, 2000, and the league began playing its first season in April 2001. It would be the world's first women's soccer league in which all the players were paid as professionals. The WUSA had previously announced plans to begin to play in 2001 in eight cities across the country, including: Atlanta, the Bay Area, Boston, New York, Orlando, Philadelphia, San Diego and Washington, D.C. The WUSA forged ahead on a cooperation agreement that would see the new league work side by side with Major League Soccer to help maximize the market presence and success of both Division I leagues. The eight teams included the Atlanta Beat, Boston Breakers, Carolina Courage, New York Power, Philadelphia Charge, San Diego Spirit, San Jose CyberRays (called Bay Area CyberRays for 2001 season), and the Washington Freedom.

The WUSA played for three full seasons. The WUSA suspended operations, however, on September 15, 2003, shortly after the conclusion of the third season, due to financial problems and lack of public interest in the sport.

=== Post-WUSA (2004–2009) ===
With the WUSA on hiatus, the Women's Premier Soccer League (WPSL) and the W-League regained their status as the premier women's soccer leagues in the United States, and many former WUSA players joined those teams.

The Washington Freedom was the only WUSA team to continue operations after the league dissolved (although new versions of the Atlanta Beat and Boston Breakers formed in 2009) and eventually became a part of the W-League in 2006.

After the folding of WUSA, WUSA Reorganization Committee was formed in September 2003 that led to the founding of Women's Soccer Initiative, Inc. (WSII), whose stated goal was "promoting and supporting all aspects of women's soccer in the United States", including the founding of a new professional league. Initial plans were to play a scaled-down version of WUSA in 2004. However, these plans fell through and instead, in June 2004, the WUSA held two "WUSA Festivals" in Los Angeles and Blaine, Minnesota, featuring matches between reconstituted WUSA teams in order to maintain the league in the public eye and sustain interest in women's professional soccer. A planned full relaunch in 2005 also fell through. In June 2006, WSII announced the relaunch of the league for the 2008 season.

In December 2006, WSII announced that it reached an agreement with six owner-operators for teams based in Chicago, Dallas, Los Angeles, St. Louis, Washington, D.C., and a then-unnamed city. In September 2007, the launch was pushed back from Spring of 2008 to 2009 to avoid clashing with 2007 Women's World Cup and the 2008 Olympic Games and to ensure that all of the teams were fully prepared for long-term operations.

=== WPS (2009–2012) ===
The name for the new professional league, along with its logo, was announced on January 17, 2008. The league was to have its inaugural season in 2009, with seven teams, including the Washington Freedom, a former WUSA team. Twenty-one U.S. national team players were allocated to each of the seven teams in September 2008. Also in September, the league held the 2008 WPS International Draft.

Unlike WUSA, the WPS took "a local, grassroots approach", and "a slow and steady growth type of approach," In addition, the WPS attempted to have a closer relationship with Major League Soccer in order to cut costs.

Most teams considered the first season a moderate success, despite many losing more money than planned. However, most teams began to see problems in 2010. Overall attendance for 2010 was noticeably down from 2009, teams were struggling with financial problems, and the WPS changed leadership by the end of the season.

The success of the United States women's national soccer team at the 2011 FIFA Women's World Cup resulted in an upsurge in attendance league-wide as well as interest in new teams for the 2012 season. However, several internal organization struggles, including an ongoing legal battle with magicJack-owner Dan Borislow, and lack of resources invested in the league led to the suspension of 2012, announced in January 2012.

On May 18, 2012, the WPS announced that the league had officially ceased operations, having played for only three seasons.

=== WPSL Elite (2012) ===
By this time, the WPSL and W-League were the two semi-pro leagues in the United States and had sat under WUSA and the WPS until 2012. Upon the disbandment of the WPS, they once again regained their status as the premier women's soccer leagues in the United States.

In response to the suspension and eventual end, of the WPS, the Women's Premier Soccer League created the Women's Premier Soccer League Elite (WPSL Elite) to support the sport in the United States. For the 2012 season, the league featured former WPS teams, Boston Breakers, Chicago Red Stars, and Western New York Flash, in addition to many WPSL teams. Six of the eight teams were considered fully professional.

Many members of the USWNT remained unattached for the 2012 season while others chose to play in the W-League instead of the WPSL Elite.

=== Modern-day leagues (2013–present) ===
==== NWSL (2013–present) ====
After the WPS folded in 2012, the United States Soccer Federation (USSF) announced a roundtable for the discussion of the future of women's professional soccer in the United States. The meeting resulted in the planning of a new league set to launch in 2013 with 12–16 teams, taking from the WPS, the W-League, and the WPSL.

The league was officially announced by U.S. Soccer on November 21, 2012, with the Canadian Soccer Association (CSA) and Mexican Football Federation (FMF) also participating in the announcement. The league was ultimately called the National Women's Soccer League (NWSL). Teams in the NWSL are privately owned, but national federations are heavily involved in league financing and operations. All three federations initially paid salaries for many of their respective national team members. U.S. Soccer committed to funding up to 24 national team members, with the CSA committing to paying 16 players and FMF pledging support for 12 to 16 (ultimately 16). This freed each of the eight charter teams from having to pay salaries for up to seven players. In addition, U.S. Soccer hosts the new league's front office, and is scheduling matches to avoid conflicts with international tournaments. Today, only U.S. Soccer and the CSA still provide support (including allocating players) to the NWSL; FMF and NWSL ended their relationship (presumably amicably) in 2017, when FMF launched its own national women's league, Liga MX Femenil.

Four of the league's charter teams had WPS ties—the Boston Breakers, Chicago Red Stars, a revival of the New Jersey–based Sky Blue FC, and the Western New York Flash. The other four were in Kansas City, Portland, Seattle, and Washington, D.C., with the Portland team being run by the Portland Timbers. The league added its second MLS-linked team in 2014 with the entry of the Houston Dash, run by the Houston Dynamo and playing in the Dynamo's stadium. A third NWSL team, FC Kansas City, announced a partnership with Sporting Kansas City in 2015; although the two clubs continued to be separately owned, FC Kansas City would use Sporting's facilities for practices and home games. Another MLS-linked team joined the league in 2016 with the arrival of the Orlando Pride, operated by Orlando City SC.

The 2016–17 offseason saw the league's first major relocation, with the Flash selling their NWSL franchise rights to the owner of North Carolina FC, then playing in the NASL and now in USL League One, who moved the NWSL team to the Research Triangle of North Carolina and relaunched it as the North Carolina Courage.

The NWSL became the first professional women's league to reach more than eight teams with the addition of the Houston Dash and Orlando Pride (10 teams in the league in 2016 and 2017) and the first to sustain more than three years of operations. In 2017, A&E Networks bought an equity stake in the league and broadcasts a game of the week on Lifetime and streams all games online via the go90 platform.

Following the 2017 season, FC Kansas City folded. Kansas City's place in the NWSL was immediately filled by a new franchise operated by another MLS club, Real Salt Lake; the new team was unveiled shortly thereafter as Utah Royals FC. In January 2018, the league dropped to 9 teams with the demise of the Boston Breakers, which had been the only team to have participated in every previous season of U.S. top-flight professional women's soccer.

The Utah Royals ceased operations at the end of the 2020 season due to the fallout from a racism controversy surrounding Real's owner; the NWSL franchise rights were awarded to a Kansas City ownership group that had no members in common with the former FC Kansas City ownership. The new Kansas City team played in the 2021 season under the placeholder name of Kansas City NWSL before announcing its permanent identity of Kansas City Current at the end of that season.

The NWSL membership announced in October 2019 the entry of a Louisville team in 2021. The team, ultimately unveiled as Racing Louisville FC, is owned and operated by USL Championship side Louisville City FC.

The most recent teams to start NWSL play are two California teams that played their first season in 2022—the Los Angeles–based Angel City FC and San Diego Wave FC. Two more NWSL teams are scheduled to start or resume play in 2024. First, the new ownership of Real Salt Lake exercised an option to revive Utah Royals FC; the team would be revived without the "FC" in its branding. This was soon followed by the announcement of a new team for the San Francisco Bay Area, soon unveiled as Bay FC. A new team in Boston, unrelated to the Breakers, has been announced for 2026.

=== USL Super League (2022–present) ===
Originally slated to begin play in 2022 as a D-2 league, the USL Super League began play in 2024 as a top-division league with eight inaugural members. Unique to most other soccer leagues, the Super League follows the global soccer calendar, starting in the fall and taking a break in the winter before resuming in the spring.

=== Lower divisions ===
==== W-League, WPSL, and UWS ====
Originally called the United States Interregional Women's League, the W-League was formed in 1995 to provide a professional outlet for many of the top female soccer players in the country. Starting as the Western Division of the W-League, the Women's Premier Soccer League (WPSL) broke away and formed its own league in 1997 and had its inaugural season in 1998. Both the W-League and the WPSL were considered the premier women's soccer leagues in the United States at the time but eventually fell to a "second-tier" level upon the formation of the Women's United Soccer Association.

The W-League grew as large as 41 teams in 2008, but its membership fell rapidly from that point on, and the league folded after its 2015 season. Of the 18 teams that competed in the final season of the W-League, seven joined the WPSL, and eight formed a new second-level league, United Women's Soccer (UWS). This new league ultimately launched in 2016 with 11 teams, including six of the founding members (the other two, both Canadian teams, were denied licenses by the Canadian Soccer Association). UWS expanded to 21 teams, including one new Canadian side, in 2017.

==== USL W League ====
The United Soccer League has since announced the establishment of a full development pathway for women's soccer. First, in 2022, the USL launched the USL W League (not to be confused with the former W-League), a third-level semi-pro league. The W League launched with 44 teams.

== Men's professional soccer ==
=== Major League Soccer ===
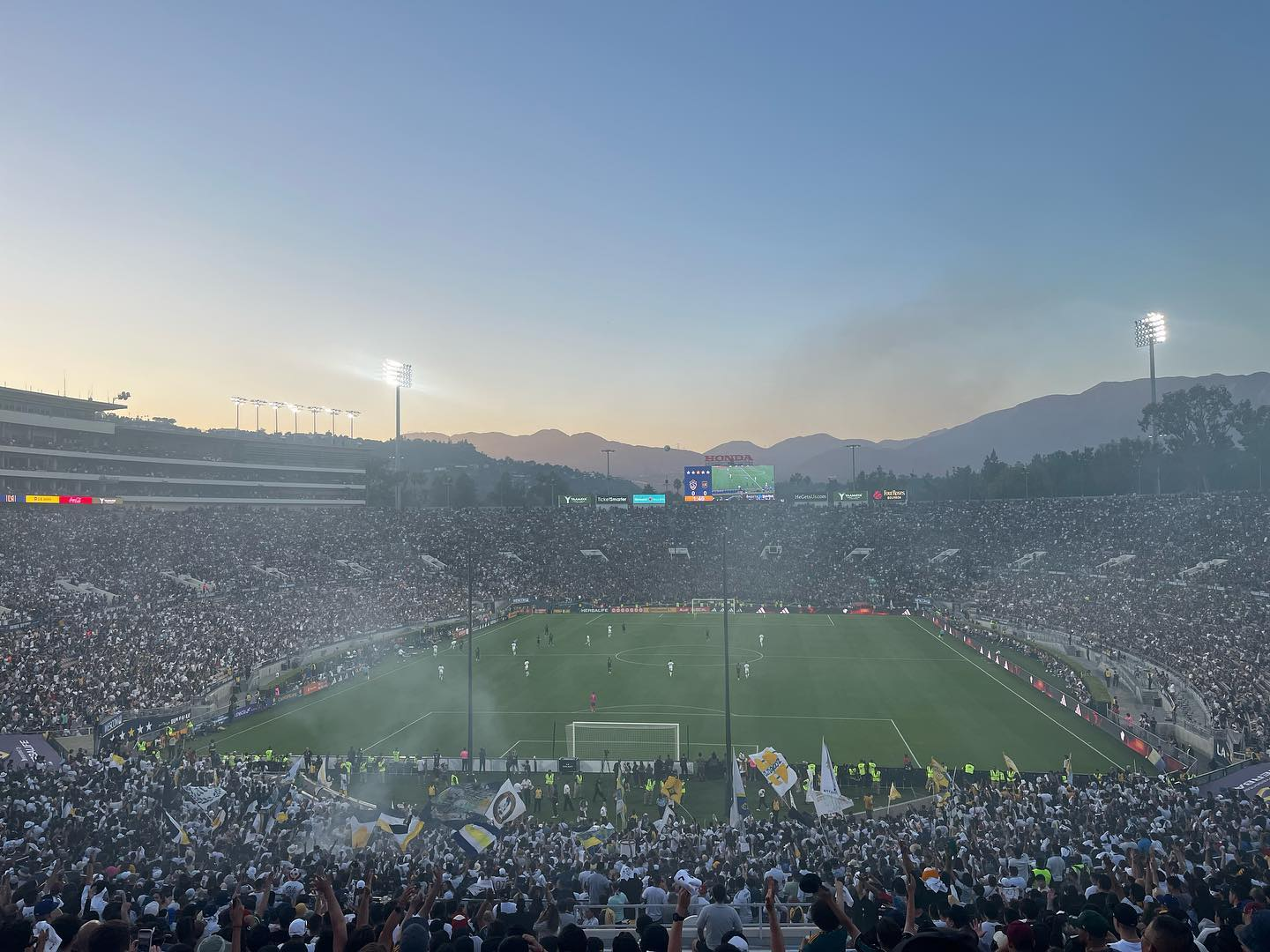
LA Galaxy and Los Angeles FC disputing El Trafico, one of the biggest rivalries in the MLS

Major League Soccer (MLS) is the professional first-division league in the United States. As of the current 2025 season, it has 30 teams — 27 in the U.S. and 3 in Canada. MLS is currently the largest first-division professional soccer league in the world by number of teams. With careful cost controls and the construction of soccer-specific stadiums, some MLS clubs became profitable for the first time in the mid-2000s, and Forbes magazine found that three clubs were already valued at $40 million or more, with the Los Angeles Galaxy worth $100 million. The establishment of the Designated Player Rule in 2007 has led to the signings of international superstars such as David Beckham, Thierry Henry, and Lionel Messi.

Major League Soccer has been in an expansion phase, going from 10 teams in 2005 to 30 teams today. The league's 2007 and 2009 expansion to Toronto and Seattle, respectively, have proven highly successful, with league-leading ticket and merchandise sales, capped by sold-out attendances for friendlies against Real Madrid of Spain and Chelsea of England. In 2013, New York City FC agreed to pay a record $100 million expansion fee for the right to join MLS in 2015. This record was surpassed by the ownership groups of FC Cincinnati and a new Nashville team, which each paid $150 million to join MLS (FC Cincinnati in 2019 and Nashville in 2020). (Note: A Miami team announced in January 2018 and later unveiled as Inter Miami CF only paid a $25 million fee. David Beckham, the public face of the ownership group, received an option for a future MLS team at that specified fee as part of his original MLS playing contract in 2007.) The same amount was paid as an effective entrance fee by a group that bought Columbus Crew SC in 2018, which led to that team's previous operator receiving a new team in Austin, Texas that joined MLS in 2021. The league expanded to 27 teams with the addition of Austin FC in 2021 and 28 with Charlotte FC in 2022 (delayed from the original 2021 schedule), then St. Louis City SC in 2023 (delayed from 2022), and finally San Diego FC in 2025.

MLS average attendance has been steadily growing, from 13,756 in 2000 to 22,113 in 2017. MLS has drawn a higher per-game attendance than NBA basketball and NHL hockey every year since 2011. With an average attendance of over 20,000 per game, MLS has the third highest average attendance of any sports league in the U.S. after the National Football League (NFL) and Major League Baseball (MLB), and is the seventh highest attended professional soccer league worldwide.

Professional soccer has been less popular in the United States than most other parts of the world. Although MLS is also much younger than most other countries' first divisions, it is the twelfth most-attended premier division in the world. MLS has announced its goal of developing into one of the top soccer leagues in the world by 2022.

Average franchise valuations
Year	Value
2008	$37 million
2013	$103 million
2015	$157 million
2016	$185 million
2017	$223 million
2018	$240 million

Unlike club football leagues in other countries, Major League Soccer does not have promotion and relegation, and instead utilizes a franchise system similar to other professional sports leagues in the country. In addition, Major League Soccer operates as a single entity, meaning that all clubs are owned by the league, with club investor-operators holding shares in the league itself rather than owning their teams directly, and all players being centrally contracted. Major League Soccer has faced criticisms for this structure, as well as other deviations such as scheduling matches during time periods designated by the FIFA Calendar for international play (which can affect the quality of MLS matches taking place within, although the league had been working to reduce the number of matches during these windows). However, it has also been noted that the league's salary caps have helped to discourage rampant spending, allowing for steadier long-term growth.

By 2012 the league had shown a marked improvement in its financial health. In November 2013, Forbes published a report that revealed that ten of the league's nineteen teams earned an operating profit in 2012, while two broke even and seven had a loss. Forbes estimated that the league's collective annual revenues were $494 million, and that the league's collective annual profit was $34 million. Forbes valued the league's franchises to be worth $103 million on average, almost three times as much as the $37 million average valuation in 2008. The Seattle Sounders FC franchise was named the most valuable at $175 million, a 483% gain over the $30 million league entrance fee it paid in 2009.

The trend in increased team values has continued with MLS teams seeing a strong 52% increase in franchise values from 2012 to 2014. In August 2015 Forbes updated its MLS franchise values with the most profitable team measuring $245 million and the least $105 million. The average value jumped from $103 to $157 million.

As of 2018 Forbes estimates Atlanta United FC are the most valuable MLS team, worth $330 million, while the Colorado Rapids are the lowest value, at $155 million. These valuations do not include the value of stadiums or training facilities owned by the respective clubs.

The North American Soccer League (NASL) repeatedly accused Major League Soccer of having a monopoly position being defended by the United States Soccer Federation, such as accusing the USSF of proposing to change the minimum criteria for a Division I league to include specifications that only MLS could currently meet, such as minimum stadium capacities and requiring at least 75% of teams to be in metropolitan areas with a population of at least 2 million.

Men's Pro Soccer Teams in the United States
Year	Teams	MLS (D1)	NASL (D2)	USLC (D2)	USL1 (D3)	NISA (D3)	MLS Next Pro (D3)
2011	38	18	8	12	—	—	—
2012	38	19	8	11	—	—	—
2013	40	19	8	13	—	—	—
2014	43	19	10	14	—	—	—
2015	55	20	11	24	—	—	—
2016	61	20	12	29	—	—	—
2017	60	22	8	30	—	—	—
2018	56	23	—	33	—	—	—
2019	79	24	—	36	10	9	—
2020	80	26	—	35	11	8	–
2021	78	27	—	31	12	10	–
2022	97	28	—	27	11	10	21
2023	101	29	—	24	12	9	27
2024	103	29	—	24	12	9	29
2025	97	30	—	24	14	—	29
2026	100	30	—	25	17	—	30

=== Second division ===
Since the 2018 season, the second tier of North American soccer has been occupied by the USL Championship, rebranded from the United Soccer League after the 2018 season. This league received provisional sanctioning by U.S. Soccer before the 2018 season. The second iteration of the North American Soccer League had functioned at the second level under provisional status through the 2017 season, but more recent developments led to the effective demise of that league.

==== NASL: Formation, instability, and demise ====
The new North American Soccer League was formed in late 2009, with plans to launch in the 2010 season, by disgruntled team owners from the USL First Division, after Nike sold its stake in the latter league's parent corporation, then known as the United Soccer Leagues and now as the United Soccer League (USL). U.S. Soccer refused to sanction either the First Division or the new NASL for 2010, and the two groups eventually agreed to unite for 2010 only under the banner of USSF Division 2, run directly by U.S. Soccer and including teams from both leagues. U.S. Soccer initially sanctioned the new NASL in November 2010, revoked its sanctioning in January 2011 due to financial issues surrounding the ownership of several teams, and re-sanctioned it in February 2011. The NASL launched in 2011 with eight teams—five on the U.S. mainland, one in Puerto Rico (a U.S. commonwealth that has its own national federation), and two in Canada. One of the Canadian teams left the NASL after the 2011 season to enter MLS; the league remained at eight teams for 2012 as San Antonio Scorpions FC joined NASL. In 2013, a new version of the New York Cosmos joined the NASL. Ottawa Fury FC and Indy Eleven joined in 2014. Three teams were set to join the league in 2015—Jacksonville Armada FC, Virginia Cavalry FC, and Oklahoma City FC—but only the Jacksonville team actually began play. Virginia Cavalry is no longer listed as a future team on the NASL website; Oklahoma City FC was bought by the owner of Spanish club Rayo Vallecano and rebranded as Rayo OKC, which began play in 2016. Two other teams, Miami FC and Puerto Rico FC, were launched in 2016, with Miami starting play in the league's spring season and Puerto Rico in the fall season. At the same time, the Atlanta Silverbacks self-relegated to the lower-level National Premier Soccer League and the San Antonio Scorpions folded. After the 2016 season, Minnesota United left for MLS, Rayo OKC folded, and Ottawa Fury FC and the Tampa Bay Rowdies left for the USL.

Since then, the NASL has experienced even more instability. The San Francisco Deltas joined for the 2017 season but folded after that season despite winning the league's title. During that offseason, after the USSF pulled the NASL's provisional Division II status due to not meeting its criteria, the NASL filed an antitrust lawsuit against the USSF. The NASL accused the USSF of colluding with Major League Soccer to protect its status as the sole top-flight soccer league in the United States, citing a relationship under which MLS clubs are required to maintain affiliations or co-owned reserve teams in the USL. The suit was not supported by all of the league's teams; FC Edmonton was not involved in the action (and would cease professional operations due to the uncertainty stemming from the lawsuit (Note: FC Edmonton eventually announced in 2018 that it would resume professional operations and join the Canadian Premier League for its inaugural 2019 season.)), and North Carolina FC did not support the suit. While the league added two teams for 2018 in California United FC and San Diego 1904 FC, it lost four teams—the aforementioned San Francisco Deltas, FC Edmonton and NCFC, plus Indy Eleven; the last two of these teams moved to the USL. Due to the ongoing litigation, the NASL canceled its 2018 spring season, though choosing to frame it as a change to a fall-to-spring schedule spanning two calendar years. After a federal court denied an injunction that would have maintained the NASL's second-division status, the league announced that it would also not play a 2018 fall season. The league never resumed play.

==== United Soccer League: Establishment and growth ====
Following the USL–NASL feud and a subsequent tightening of U.S. Soccer standards for owners of second-division teams, the USL folded its First and Second Divisions into a new third-level league originally known as USL Pro, later as the United Soccer League, and now as the USL Championship. The league launched in 2011 with 15 teams–11 on the U.S. mainland, three in Puerto Rico, and one in Antigua and Barbuda—but due to issues with the health and finances of two of the Puerto Rican owners, the Puerto Rican teams were dropped from the league shortly after the beginning of its first season. One of the U.S.-based teams folded following the 2011 season; two new U.S.-based teams joined the league in 2013. In that same year, MLS and USL Pro entered into a formal agreement that eventually merged the MLS Reserve League into the USL Pro structure. For a time, each MLS team was nominally required to field a reserve team in a USL league, either by operating a standalone team or affiliating with an independently owned team, though this was never strictly enforced. After the 2013 season, the Antigua and Barbuda team folded, as well as one U.S.-based team. In addition, one U.S.-based team left the league but was replaced by a new team in the same area; and three completely new teams entered the league for 2014. One of the new teams was an MLS reserve side.

Attendance leaders: Minor leagues (2019)
Rank	Attendance	Team	League
1	12,693	New Mexico United	USLC
2	10,734	Indy Eleven	USLC
3	10,436	Sacramento Republic FC	USLC
4	9,041	Louisville City FC	USLC
5	7,711	Las Vegas Lights FC	USLC

The 2015 season, which coincided with the rebranding of the competition as the United Soccer League, saw a major expansion. Three teams left the league, but 13 new teams entered, bringing its membership to 24. Orlando City moved to MLS, and two other teams, the Charlotte Eagles and Dayton Dutch Lions, relegated themselves to the PDL. Two of the three departing teams were replaced by new franchises; the Eagles' franchise rights were acquired by a local group that launched the Charlotte Independence, and Louisville interests bought Orlando City's USL franchise rights and launched Louisville City FC. Both of these clubs became affiliates of MLS teams, respectively the Colorado Rapids and Orlando City. Seven MLS teams—the Montreal Impact, New York Red Bulls, Portland Timbers, Real Salt Lake, Seattle Sounders, Toronto FC, and Vancouver Whitecaps—began fielding team-operated reserve sides in the USL. The Orlando City–Louisville affiliation was only for the 2015 season, as Orlando City launched Orlando City B, its own USL reserve side, in 2016.

The USL expanded to 29 teams in 2016. While Austin Aztex went on hiatus for that season while seeking to build a new stadium, six new teams were launched. Three are operated by MLS teams—Orlando City B, Bethlehem Steel FC (Philadelphia Union), and Swope Park Rangers (Sporting Kansas City). The other three are FC Cincinnati and San Antonio FC, neither of which had an MLS affiliation, and the Rio Grande Valley FC Toros. The Toros are the first USL team with a so-called "hybrid affiliation" with an MLS team; the Houston Dynamo selects players and coaches, while the separate Toros ownership group runs all business affairs. In 2017, the USL expanded to 30 teams. The Aztex ultimately folded without building a new stadium, and two other teams from the 2016 season did not play in 2017. The Wilmington Hammerheads self-relegated to the USL's Premier Development League (PDL), now known as USL League Two, and the Montreal Impact folded FC Montreal in favor of an affiliation with the incoming Ottawa Fury FC. At the same time, three new teams entered the league, with Ottawa Fury FC and the Tampa Bay Rowdies joining from the NASL, and the completely new Reno 1868 FC competing as a hybrid affiliate of the San Jose Earthquakes. U.S. Soccer awarded the USL provisional second-level status for the 2017 season alongside the NASL.

Further USL expansion was announced for 2019 and beyond. With the folding of one team, the departure of two, and the addition of six, the league featured 33 teams in its 2018 season. Permanently departing was Whitecaps FC 2, which was folded by its MLS parent, the Vancouver Whitecaps. Orlando City B and the Rochester Rhinos went on hiatus, but eventually chose not to return to the USL's top flight. Of the six new USL teams for 2018, four were new sides—Atlanta United 2 (owned by Atlanta United FC), Fresno FC (which took over the Whitecaps affiliation), Las Vegas Lights FC, and Nashville SC. The other new USL teams were former NASL sides Indy Eleven and North Carolina FC. The following year saw four teams leave the rebranded USL Championship and seven new teams join. The departing teams were FC Cincinnati, which joined MLS; the Richmond Kickers and Toronto FC II, both of which became founding members of USL League One, a third-level league that began play in 2019; and the Harrisburg, Pennsylvania-based Penn FC, which suspended professional operations for 2019 before resuming play in League One in 2020. In addition, both clubs that had gone on hiatus after the 2017 USL season would later announce moves to League One. Orlando City B resumed play alongside Toronto FC II as an inaugural League One team, while the Rochester Rhinos initially planned not to resume professional operations until joining League One in 2020 (the Rhinos ultimately did not resume play until 2022, joining MLS Next Pro under the new name of Rochester New York FC). The teams that began play in the USL Championship in 2019 are Austin Bold FC (replacing the Aztex), Birmingham Legion FC, El Paso Locomotive FC, Hartford Athletic, Loudoun United FC, Memphis 901 FC, and New Mexico United. Of these new sides, one was an MLS reserve team, namely Loudoun United, which replaced the Richmond Kickers as the D.C. United reserve side. Three teams ceased USL operations after the 2019 season—the identity of Nashville SC was assumed by the city's new MLS team, and Fresno FC and Ottawa Fury FC suspended all operations, with the latter having been denied sanctioning by U.S. Soccer and CONCACAF. Fresno FC's owner maintained his USLC franchise rights, and eventually relaunched the side in the Monterey, California area as Monterey Bay FC in 2022. The Fury sold its USLC franchise rights to the owners of Miami FC, then members of the third-level National Independent Soccer Association (NISA), and Miami FC accordingly joined the USLC in 2020. San Diego Loyal SC also joined the USL Championship in 2020. Teams in Chicago and California's East Bay were set to launch in 2021, but the Chicago team's launch was pushed back to an indeterminate future date before plans for that team were scrapped, and the East Bay bid faltered due to stadium issues. In addition to the East Bay team, Queensboro FC, based in the New York City borough of Queens, originally planned to start USLC play in 2021, but this was pushed back to 2023.

The USLC has been significantly affected by three phenomena in the early 2020s—financial issues triggered by COVID-19, further MLS expansion, and the decision by MLS to reestablish its reserve league in 2022 under the banner of MLS Next Pro. After the 2020 season, Saint Louis FC folded after the 2020 season due to a combination of COVID-19 impact and the impending arrival of St. Louis City SC in MLS; Reno 1868 FC folded due to COVID-19 impact; North Carolina FC voluntarily dropped to USL1; and the Philadelphia Union and Portland Timbers withdrew their reserve sides from the USL system. Both MLS reserve sides, as well as some other such sides withdrawn earlier by their MLS parents, would resume play in Next Pro. After the 2021 season, Austin Bold FC went on hiatus due to a combination of the MLS arrival of Austin FC and stadium issues, with plans to relocate to another Texas city; Charlotte Independence dropped to USL1, largely due to the 2022 MLS arrival of Charlotte FC; and three more MLS teams (Real Salt Lake, Seattle Sounders FC, Sporting Kansas City) moved their reserve sides from the USLC to Next Pro. Additionally, all remaining MLS reserve sides still playing in the USL system joined Next Pro in 2023.

Nonetheless, several teams have joined the Championship during that period. The franchise rights of the East Bay group were purchased by NISA side Oakland Roots SC, which moved to the USLC in 2021. Another NISA side, Detroit City FC, moved to the USLC in 2022, and as mentioned above the former Fresno FC franchise resumed play as Monterey Bay FC. OKC Energy FC went on hiatus for 2022, but plans on returning by 2027 pending the construction of a soccer-specific stadium. Expansion teams such as Rhode Island FC joined in 2024, entering alongside North Carolina FC, who rejoined the league after winning League 1. Brooklyn FC, an expansion club, and Lexington SC, who came from League 1, are expected to join in 2025, followed along by teams in Milwaukee, Buffalo, and Des Moines joining in the coming years. League 1 is also continuing its expansion, with teams like the Portland Heart of Pine, Santa Barbara Sky FC, and Texoma FC slated to join in 2024.

=== Lower divisions ===
The United Soccer League operates five leagues in all, with a sixth set to start play in 2024. These leagues span the lower divisions of men's professional soccer, as well as women's and youth soccer. The most recent addition to the USL lineup is the USL W League, a semi-pro third-level women's league that started play in 2022 with 45 teams. This is not to be confused with the similar USL W-League, which operated from 1995 to 2015. This will be followed in 2024 with the launch of the USL Super League, a fully professional second-level women's league. The most recent addition to the USL men's lineup is USL League One, a third-level men's league that began play in 2019. Below the USL Championship and League One is the country's semi-professional fourth-division league, USL League Two (formerly the Premier Development League), which has (as of the 2022 season) 109 teams in the U.S. and two in Canada (the league has also previously had a team in Bermuda). Though League 2 does have some paid players, it also has many teams that are made up entirely or almost entirely of college soccer players who use the league as an opportunity to play competitive soccer in front of professional scouts during the summer, while retaining amateur status and NCAA eligibility.

Major League Soccer relaunched its reserve league under the banner of MLS Next Pro in 2022. The new league, which plays at the third level, started play with 21 teams, all of which are MLS reserve sides except the independently owned Rochester New York FC (which folded after that season). In 2023, all US-based MLS teams except D.C. United are fielding reserve sides in Next Pro.

The United States Adult Soccer Association governs amateur soccer competition for adults throughout the United States, which is effectively the amateur fifth division of soccer in the United States.

=== Cup competitions ===
The Lamar Hunt U.S. Open Cup is a knockout tournament in American soccer. The tournament is the oldest ongoing national soccer competition in the U.S. and was historically open to all United States Soccer Federation affiliated teams, from amateur adult club teams to the professional clubs of Major League Soccer. Since the 2016 edition, professional teams that are majority-owned, or whose playing staff is managed, by a higher-division outdoor professional team have been barred from the competition; all other U.S. Soccer-affiliated teams remain eligible to enter. The Open Cup was first held in 1913–14 when it was called the National Challenge Cup.

=== American leagues vs. European leagues ===
The overall league structure in the United States is significantly different from that used in almost all the rest of the world, but similar to that used by other American team sports leagues, in that there is no system of promotion and relegation between lower and higher leagues, but rather a minor league system, generally the same as other top-level pro sports leagues in North America. A plan to structure the professional and amateur leagues to use promotion and relegation, as well as regionalized leagues in the lower levels, was presented to U.S. Soccer in the 1990s. In addition, teams playing in American soccer leagues are not private clubs founded independently of the league that join a league in order to ensure regular fixtures but are instead usually franchises of the league itself. The soccer leagues in the United States also incorporate features common to other American sports leagues, most notably the determination of champions by playoffs between the top teams after the conclusion of a league season. MLS formerly had a balanced schedule, but due to the league's expansion it returned to an unbalanced schedule in 2012 that favors intra-conference matches.

American soccer leagues became more similar to leagues in the rest of the world in the early 21st century. MLS and all USL leagues now allow games to end in ties, which were initially avoided via a penalty shootout if scores were level at the end of play (This practice still exists in MLS Next Pro). This was done to avoid alienating mainstream American sports fans, who are not accustomed to tie games, but actually had the unintended consequence of alienating soccer purists who saw the change as an "Americanization" of the sport. MLS began allowing ties in the 2000 season. Additionally, MLS and USL leagues now use upward-counting clocks that do not stop for stoppages in play, and instead add on time before halftime and full-time. A countdown clock that stops for dead balls and ends the game when it reaches zero is still in use in American high school and college soccer, as well as most other American sports, but was and is completely foreign to soccer played outside the United States. MLS adopted the international clock in late 1999. Until 2007, the front of teams' shirts in MLS and USL leagues did not bear advertisements, as commercial uniform sponsorship is uncommon in American sports. However, starting in the mid-2000s, clubs were allowed to accept corporate sponsorship on the front of their shirts.

== United States national teams ==
The United States men's and women's national soccer teams represent the United States in international competition.

=== Women's national team ===
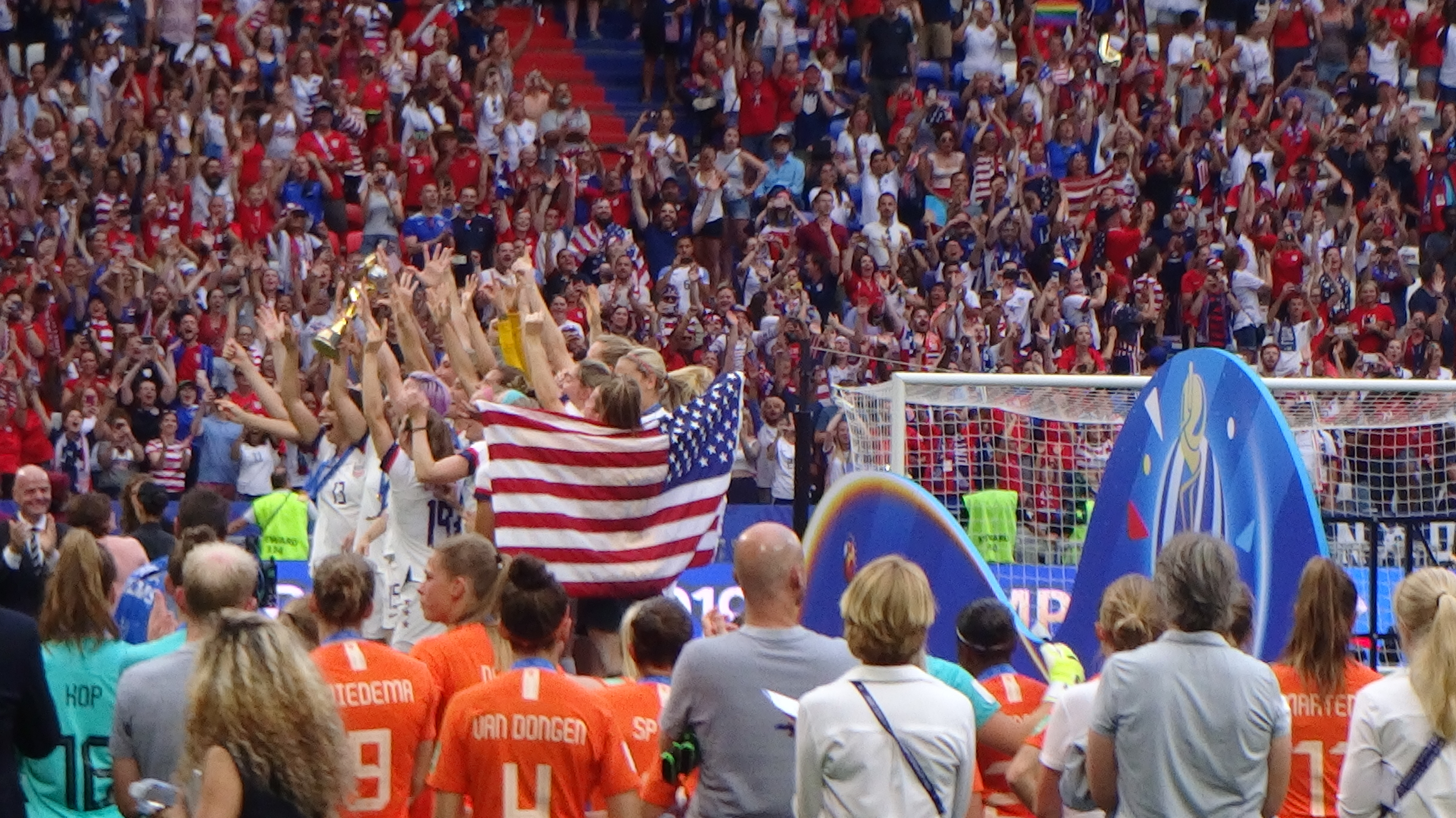
US women's national soccer team celebrating the 2019 FIFA Women's World Cup title

The women's national soccer team of the 1900s were the first women's national team in the United States. They competed in the FIFA Women's World Cup, the Summer Olympics, and the Algarve Cup, in addition to the CONCACAF Women's Championship and other competitions by invitation. The United States women's team has been one of the best national teams in the history of women's soccer, having won four World Cups (in 1991, 1999, 2015 and 2019). They also won four Olympic gold medals (in 1996, 2004, 2008, 2012, 2024) and 10 Algarve Cups (in 2000, 2003, 2004, 2005, 2007, 2008, 2010, 2011, 2013, and 2015). Following their 2015 World Cup victory, the USWNT regained the top spot in the FIFA Women's World Rankings from Germany; they have held the top spot for the majority of the time since the rankings began in 2003, and have never been lower than second.

In 1999, when the United States hosted and won the Women's World Cup, women's soccer briefly captivated the American public on an unprecedented scale. The tournament's final between the United States and China was watched by an estimated 40 million American television viewers.

There are several factors that may have contributed to the early dominance of the United States women's national soccer team. First is the relative lack of attention afforded the women's game in some traditional soccer-playing countries. According to a 2015 story in the ESPN-owned Web outlet FiveThirtyEight,

For as much as the rest of the world loves soccer, it has been much slower to embrace the women's game than the U.S. In England, women playing soccer was effectively banned (at least at venues that hosted men's teams) from 1921 to 1971, and in Germany it was banned from 1955 to 1970. At around the time Title IX was heating up in the United States, women's international soccer basically didn't exist. According to FIFA, there were only three national teams and two international matches played in 1971.

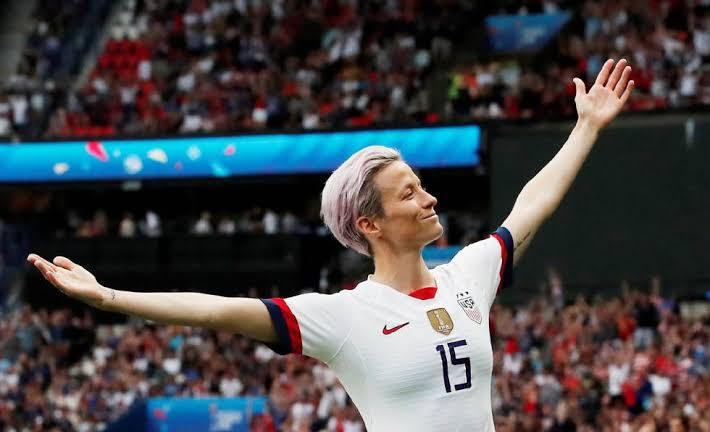
Megan Rapinoe winner of the Ballon d'Or Féminin and considered one of the greatest players in the women's team history

Additionally, in the years following Title IX, American high schools and colleges have been steadily embracing girls' and women's soccer. According to the National Federation of State High School Associations (NFHS), the U.S. had little more than 10,000 girls playing high school soccer in the late 1970s. This number had increased to 120,000 by 1991 when the USWNT claimed its first World Cup title, and 250,000 by 1999, the year of the second World Cup title. In 2015, there were about 375,000 girls playing high school soccer, making up 47% of all high school soccer players, and soccer has recently surpassed softball as the third-most-played girls' team sport. At the college level, 53% of all NCAA soccer players are women, and this percentage rises to 61% at the highest level, Division I.

Another contributing factor is the role of women within American society, which includes relative equality (especially rejecting hardened gender roles) for women in the United States relative to many other countries. This is also reflected in official government policy regarding women in athletics, specifically the landmark Title IX legislation, which broadly requires any educational institution that receives federal government funds to support men's and women's educational programs equally, thus including athletics. America's approach to growing the game among women has served as a model for other countries' development programs for women at all levels.

However, the FiveThirtyEight story suggested that the U.S. does not take adult women's soccer as seriously as some other countries, notably Germany. On a per capita basis, the U.S. and Germany have essentially identical participation among girls. However, the two countries differ greatly in the age profile of their registered female players. Nearly 95% of registered female players in the U.S. are youths, as opposed to 31% in Germany. In turn, this leads to Germany having more than six times the number of serious adult female players as the U.S. (about 650,000 to 100,000).

=== Men's national team ===
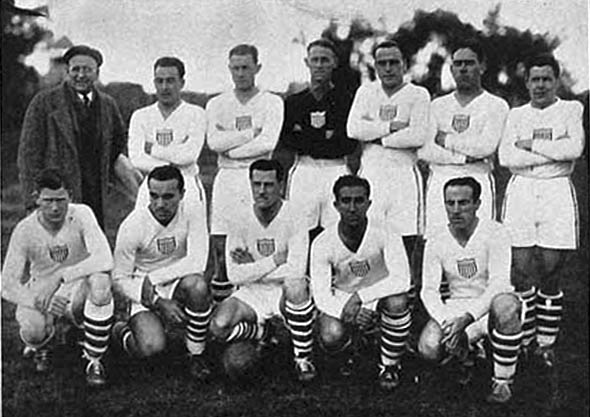
US men's national soccer team at the 1930 FIFA World Cup

The men's national team competes in the FIFA World Cup and the FIFA Confederations Cup, in addition to the CONCACAF Gold Cup and other competitions by invitation.

The U.S. national team had some success in early FIFA World Cup tournaments. The U.S. finished third in the World Cup in 1930, and played in the 1934 World Cup. The next World Cup participation came in the 1950 World Cup, where they upset England 1–0 in group play. After 1950, the U.S. did not return to the World Cup for another 40 years, returning in 1990.

The fortunes of the U.S. national team changed in the 1990s, with the team participating in every World Cup between 1990 and 2014. The U.S. hosted the 1994 World Cup, beating Colombia to reach the knockout rounds, before losing to Brazil in the round of sixteen. The team reached the quarter-finals of the 2002 World Cup by defeating its rival Mexico. The U.S. team would only win its group for the second time at the 2010 World Cup.

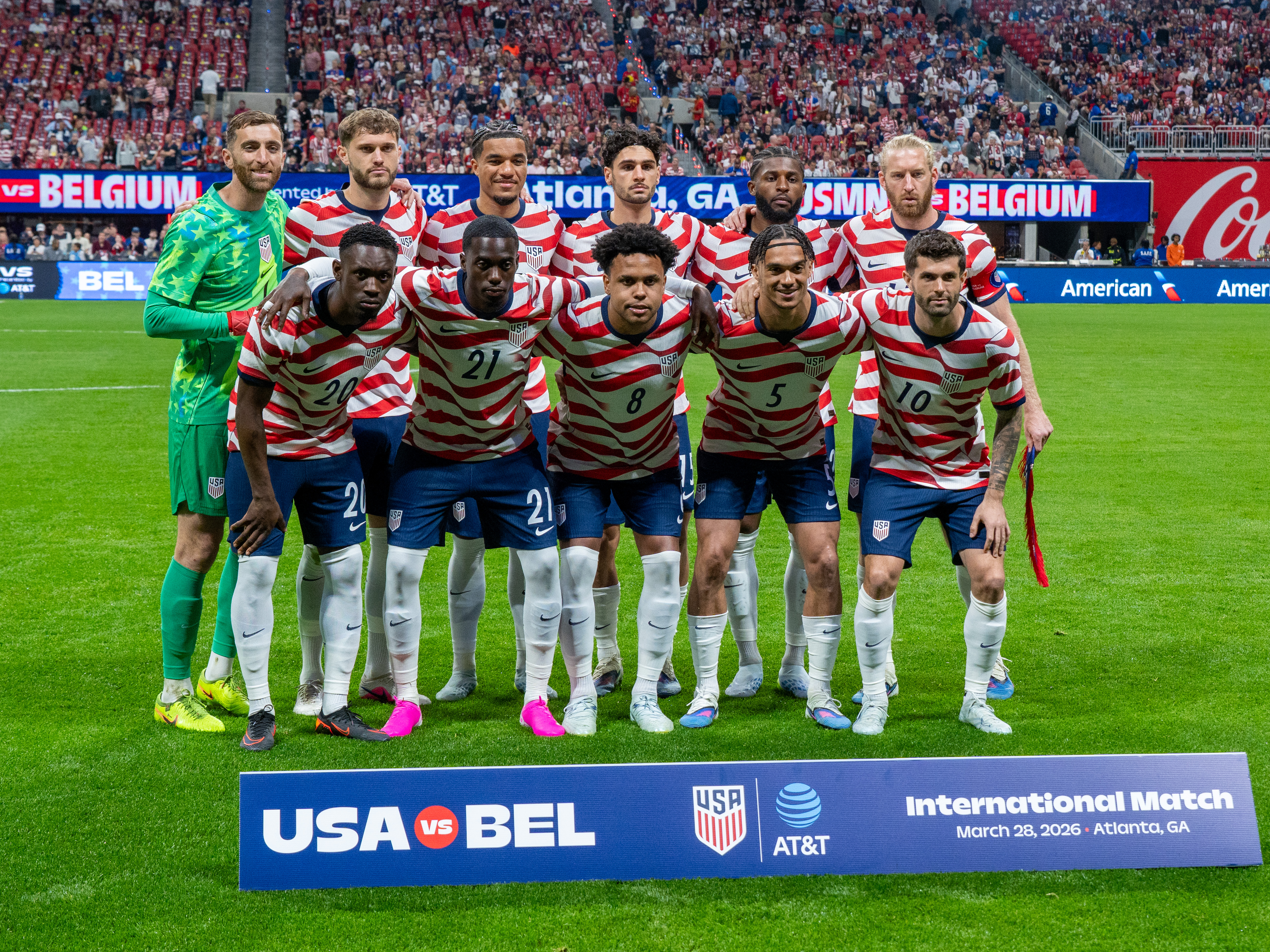
US men's national soccer team before a friendly match against Belgium in 2026

The U.S. national team participated in the 2009 FIFA Confederations Cup. The U.S. defeated #1 ranked Spain in the semifinals, before losing to Brazil 3–2 in the final. On the regional stage, the national team has also improved, with a record up to 2013 of reaching the final of the biannual CONCACAF Gold Cup nine times since 1989, winning it seven times: 1991, 2002, 2005, 2007, 2013, 2017, and 2021.

Most recently, the U.S. national team won the first 2021 CONCACAF Nations League, defeating Mexico 3–2 in overtime. The match was widely considered as a revival of the United States-Mexico rivalry following the struggles of U.S. soccer between 2017 and 2020.

The national team has development teams at a number of different ages, the most popular youth national team groups are the Olympic team made up of primarily U23 player, the U20s who has their own World Cup and the u17s who also have their own World Cup.

== College soccer ==
In the United States, college soccer is featured in many collegiate athletic associations including the NCAA, the NAIA, the NCCAA, and the USCAA. Many top American college soccer players play for separate teams in USL League Two during the summer.

The NCAA Division I Men's Soccer Championship, the semifinals and finals of which are known as the College Cup, is an American intercollegiate college soccer tournament conducted by the NCAA and determines the Division I men's national champion. The tournament has been formally held since 1959, when it crowned Saint Louis University as the inaugural champion. The tournament's current format involves 48 teams, in which every Division I conference tournament champion is allocated a berth. Since its inception, Saint Louis (10 titles), Indiana (8 titles), and Virginia (6 titles) have historically been the most successful Division I schools. Indiana has appeared in more College Cups (18) and has a higher winning percentage in post-season play (.768) than any other school in Division I soccer.

== Youth soccer ==
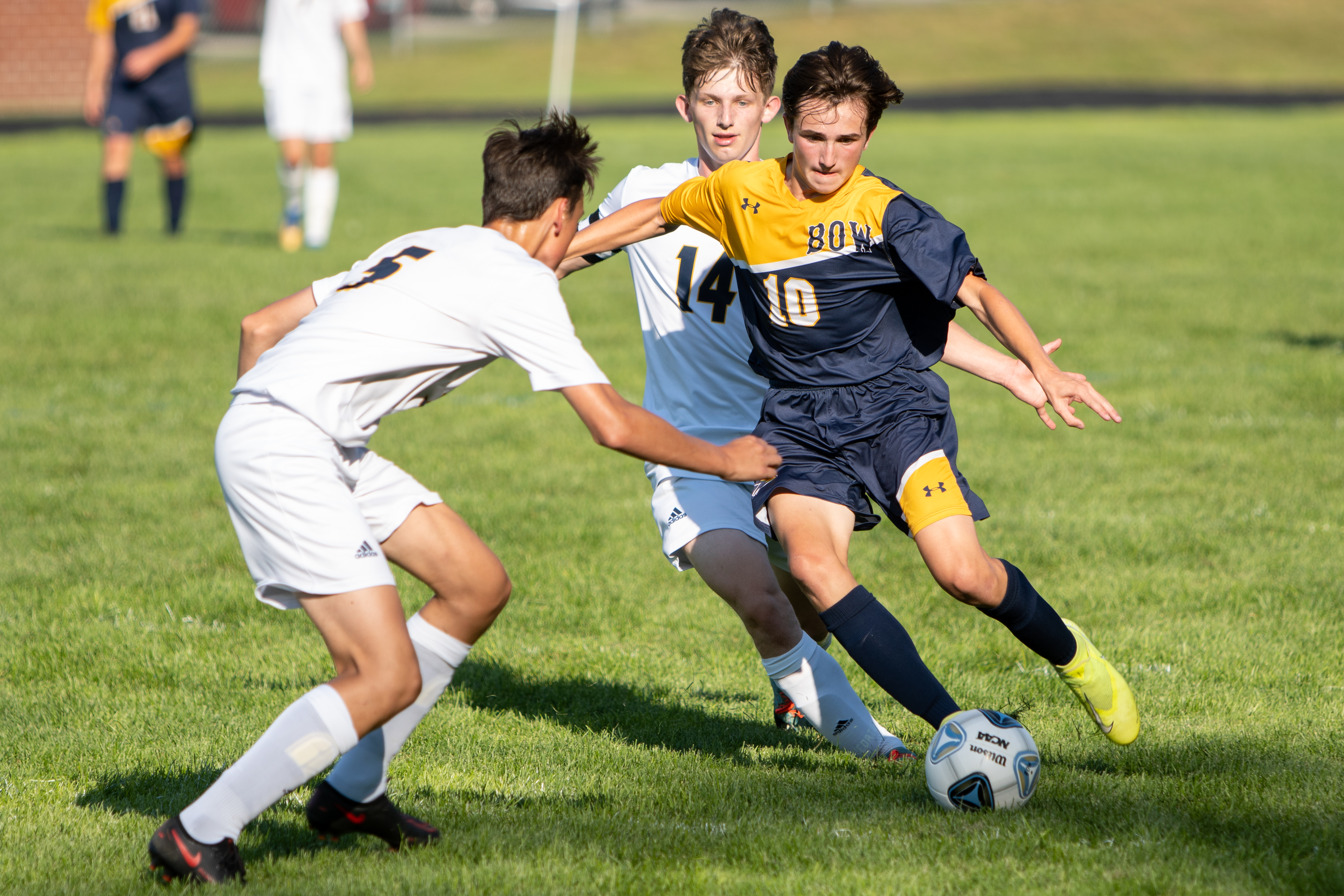
Varsity soccer being played in New Hampshire

The largest category of soccer in the United States in terms of participation is boys' and girls' youth soccer. Soccer is one of the most played sports by children in the United States. In 2012, soccer was the #1 most played team sport by high school boys, and soccer overtook softball to become the #3 most played team sport by high school girls. As of 2006, the U.S. was the #1 country in the world for participation in youth soccer, with 3.9 million American youths (2.3 million boys and 1.6 million girls) registered with U.S. Soccer. Among girls, the U.S. has more registered players than all other countries combined. The number of high school soccer players more than doubled from 1990 to 2010, giving soccer the fastest growth rate among all major U.S. sports.

In recent decades, more youth sports organizations have turned to soccer as a supplement to American football, and most American high schools offer both boys and girls soccer. Due to the rising number of youths playing, the term "soccer mom" is used in American social and political discourse to describe middle- or upper-middle-class suburban women with school-age children. Americans between the ages of 12 and 24 rank professional soccer as their second favorite sport behind only American football. And in 2011, the FIFA video game ranked as the #2 most popular video game in the country, behind only Madden NFL.

Though organized locally by organizations all over the United States, there are three main youth soccer club leagues working nationwide through affiliated local associations. The United States Youth Soccer Association (USYSA) boasts over three million players between the ages of five and 19, while American Youth Soccer Organization (AYSO) has more than 600,000 players between the ages of four and 19. Finally, the USL offers a number of youth leagues, including the Super-20 League and the Super Y-League, which have almost 1,000 teams and tens of thousands of players from the ages of 13 to 20.

Also, the National Federation of State High School Associations features 800,000 soccer players. However, NFHS uses rules that are somewhat different from IFAB's laws.

== American soccer associations and leagues ==
=== USSF and affiliate members ===
United States Soccer Federation (USSF)

Professional Council

- Major League Soccer (MLS), also operator of:
  - MLS Next Pro
- National Women's Soccer League (NWSL)
- United Soccer League (USL), operator of:
  - USL Championship (USLC)
  - USL League One (USL 1)
  - USL Super League (USLS; women, from 2024)
- National Independent Soccer Association (NISA)

Adult Council

- United States Adult Soccer Association (USASA)

Youth Council

- United States Specialty Sports Association (USSSA)
- United States Youth Soccer Association (USYSA)
- American Youth Soccer Organization (AYSO)
- US Club Soccer
- Soccer Association for Youth, USA (SAY)

Other affiliate members

- American Amputee Soccer Association
- Armed Forces Sports Council
- National Soccer Coaches Association of America (NSCAA)
- United States Power Soccer Association (USPSA)
- U.S. Soccer Foundation (USSF)
- United States Futsal Federation
- United States Specialty Sports Association - Soccer
- United States of America Deaf Soccer Association (USA Deaf Soccer)

=== Other organizations ===
- National Collegiate Athletic Association
- National Federation of State High School Associations
- National Intercollegiate Soccer Officials Association
- USL League Two
- National Premier Soccer League
- Eastern Premier Soccer League
- Women's Premier Soccer League
- United Women's Soccer
- Major Arena Soccer League
- Premier Arena Soccer League

== Soccer on TV ==
=== TV contracts and exposure ===
U.S. television coverage and viewership of club and international soccer are at an all-time high. Mainstream sports broadcasters Turner Sports(HBO Max, TNT, TBS), ESPN, Fox Sports, NBC Sports, and CBS Sports regularly provide coverage of soccer, as do several popular Spanish-language channels such as Univision, Telemundo, UniMás, and Galavisión. Additionally, the U.S. has several networks devoted mostly or completely to the sport, including Gol TV and beIN Sport USA.Fox Sports, NBC Sports, and CBS Sports regularly provide coverage of soccer, as do several popular Spanish-language channels such as Univision, Telemundo, UniMás, and Galavisión. Additionally, the U.S. has several networks devoted mostly or completely to the sport, including Gol TV and beIN Sport USA.

The size of the annual TV market in the U.S. for annual club soccer competitions was $126 million as of 2009. The club soccer competitions that generate the most annual revenue from TV audiences today in the United States are England's Premier League ($167 million), Major League Soccer ($90 million), the Mexican league ($50 million), Spain's La Liga ($16 million), and the UEFA Champions League ($10 million). The most widely accessed televised soccer league in the United States is Mexico's Liga MX, which has most of its games televised live and free on television channels Azteca, Telemundo, UniMás and Univision.

CBS aired a soccer series in 1967-68 but dropped it due to low ratings. In May 1976, CBS made a three-year agreement with the North American Soccer League to broadcast two games in 1976, six in 1977 and nine in 1978 but terminated the contract after the first year. The network returned to regular soccer broadcasts after it acquired the rights to UEFA club competitions in 2019 following the withdrawal of Turner Sports. CBS later acquired the rights to Serie A, several CONCACAF tournaments, and the National Women's Soccer League and launched the CBS Sports Golazo Network, a free streaming channel, alongside its paid Paramount+ service.

Fox began showing English Premier League matches on network TV in 2011, the first time that Premier League matches aired on U.S. English-language broadcast TV. U.S. TV rights for the English Premier League were sold to NBC Sports in 2012 for $250 million for three years beginning with the 2013–14 season. Viewership for the Premier League's 2013–14 season on NBC Sports was 32 million, more than double the previous season. The Premier League earns higher ratings on NBCSN than the National Hockey League, despite the fact that the Premier League is shown in the morning while NHL games are in primetime. The Premier League and NBC have continued to renew their broadcast contract; that latest extension brings the rights to the end of the 2027–28 season.

Major League Soccer has received broadcast fees from ESPN since 2008, and MLS signed a three-year deal in 2011 with NBC Sports to nationally televise 40 matches per year from 2012 to 2014. MLS has since then signed new television agreements with ESPN, Fox Sports, and Univision worth in total $90 million per year from 2015 to 2022. In 2023, MLS started a new television deal with Apple, which operates the MLS Season Pass streaming service in a deal that guarantees the league $250 million per year; selected games continue to be broadcast on Fox Sports. In addition, the 2010 UEFA Champions League final was broadcast live on the Fox Network, marking the first time that a soccer match between two European club teams was televised in the U.S. on English-language broadcast television.

Major U.S. TV contracts (club competitions)
Competition	Annual revenue	English language contract	Spanish language contract	Average viewership
Premier League (England)	$167 million	NBC Sports $2.7bn (2022/23-2027-28)	Telemundo	609,000 (NBC, USA and Peacock) (2021–22)
Liga MX (Mexico)	$120 million	Fox Sports	ESPN Deportes, Fox Deportes, Telemundo, and Univision	847,000 (Univision); 801,000 (UniMás) (2014)
UEFA Champions League (Europe)	$95 million	CBS Sports (2020–2024)	Univision	282,000 (FS1)
Major League Soccer	$250 million	Apple (2023-2033) select matches on Fox Sports	Apple (2023-2033) select matches on Fox Deportes	310,000 (ESPN); 197,000 (FS1); 230,000 (Unimas)
La Liga (Spain)	$16 million	ESPN/ESPN+	ESPN/ESPN+	213,000 (beIN)
Bundesliga (Germany)	??	ESPN/ESPN+	ESPN/ESPN+	92,000 (FS2)

These TV networks also provide coverage of international soccer competitions, including the FIFA World Cup, the FIFA Women's World Cup, the CONCACAF Gold Cup, the UEFA European Championship, the FIFA Confederations Cup, and the U.S. men's national team, and women's national team matches. The Mexico national football team is also a popular team featured on Spanish language television and on ESPN.

In addition to the World Cup, other international soccer competitions involving the U.S. team have become more popular among TV viewers. The 2007 CONCACAF Gold Cup attracted record television viewership, with the Univision telecast of the final between the United States and Mexico ranking as the third-most-watched Spanish-language program of all time in the United States, beaten only by two FIFA World Cup finals matches. The 2009 Confederations Cup Final featuring the United States attracted 6.9 million viewers (including both the English and Spanish broadcasts). The 2013 World Cup qualifier between the U.S. and Mexico drew 7 million viewers, higher than the 5.8 million average viewers of the 2013 NHL Stanley Cup finals. Three 2013 Gold Cup matches were broadcast on the main Fox network channel, the first time since 2002 that a U.S. national team match outside of the World Cup was broadcast on network TV.

TV networks in the U.S. have also begun showing international soccer tournaments that do not include the United States. Euro 2008 was shown on ESPN and ABC. Viewership for the Euro 2012 was 51% higher than 2008, with the 2012 final watched by over 4 million viewers. The viewership on ESPN of the group-stage matches of the 2013 Confederations Cup was 26% higher than the 2009 tournament, even though the U.S. did not play in the 2013 tournament.

Major U.S. TV contracts (international competitions)
Competition	Annual revenue	English language contract	Spanish language contract	Average viewership
FIFA World Cup	$134 million	Fox Sports $475 mil (2015–2026)	Telemundo $600 mil (2015–2026)	4.6 million (ESPN/ABC); 3.5 million (Univision) (2014)
FIFA Women's World Cup	*^{1}	Fox Sports (2015–2026)	Telemundo (2015–2026)	1.5 million (ESPN) (2011)
FIFA Confederations Cup	*^{1}	Fox Sports (2015–2026)	Telemundo (2015–2026)	1.6 million (Univision) (2013)
European Championship^{3}	$30 million	ESPN (2016–22)	Univision (2016–22)	1.3 million (ESPN); 325,000 (ESPN Dep.) (2012)
CONCACAF Gold Cup^{2}	??	Fox Sports; 2012/13 – 2015/16	Univision	1.5 million (Univision) (2013)

Notes:

1. The rights to the two FIFA World Cups during the 2015–2022 timeframe also include rights to the two Women's World Cups and the two Confederations Cups during those years.
2. The rights to the CONCACAF Gold Cup also include the rights to the CONCACAF Champions League.
3. The rights to the Euro also includes rights for European World Cup qualifiers, as well as the UEFA Nations League

=== FIFA World Cup on TV ===
As of 2017, the most popular soccer event on television in the U.S. was the 2015 FIFA Women's World Cup Final. It was the most watched soccer match in American history with nearly 26.7 million combined viewers, more than the 2015 NBA Finals and Stanley Cup. It was also the most watched Spanish-language broadcast in tournament history. More than 750 million viewers were reported to have watched the match worldwide. The second highest viewership in the U.S. for a soccer match was 26.5 million combined viewers for Germany vs. Argentina in the 2014 FIFA World Cup Final. Previously, the 1999 FIFA Women's World Cup Final tallied 17.9 million viewers in the U.S.

In 2005, the U.S. TV rights for the 2010 and 2014 World Cups were sold to ABC/ESPN and Univision for $425 million in "the biggest TV deal in a single country in FIFA's history." The telecasts of the 2006 FIFA World Cup Final attracted an estimated 17 million American viewers, higher than the 15.8 million average viewership of the 2006 World Series.

The total TV viewership in the U.S. for all the matches including the final for the 2010 World Cup was 112 million viewers, a 22% increase over viewing numbers for the 2006 World Cup. The 2010 World Cup final game drew 24.3 million viewers in the United States, higher than the 14.3 million average viewership of the 2010 World Series. Landon Donovan's dramatic game-winning goal against Algeria that advanced the U.S. team to the knockout stage of the 2010 World Cup resulted in jubilant celebrations across the United States. In 2011, the U.S. TV rights for the 2018 and 2022 World Cups were sold to Fox and Telemundo for a record $1.1 billion, more than any other country in the world, and 147 percent higher than the 2010 and 2014 TV rights.

By 2014, the World Cup was considered an elite sports property on U.S. television. The USA-Portugal match during the 2014 World Cup registered 24.7 million viewers in the United States, with 6.5 million viewers on Univision and 18.2 million viewers on ESPN, making it the most viewed program on ESPN, other than NFL or college football games, and eclipsing viewership numbers of other high-profile sports events such as MLB's World Series, the NBA Finals, and the NHL's Stanley Cup Finals. The 2014 FIFA World Cup also generated strong internet traffic, with the tournament generating more viewers via websites and apps than the 2012 Summer Olympics.

World Cup Tournament: cumulative combined U.S. viewership by year

Here are the complete tournament cumulative viewership combined totals for each World Cup tournament since 1994. These totals account for all matches played throughout the tournament. Since matches take place at different times, individual viewers will be counted multiple times. Only ESPN totals have been accounted for. Please find Spanish viewership as well.

FIFA World Cup: cumulative U.S. viewership by year
Year	Location	Matches	Viewers (millions)	Ref.
1994	United States	52	145.6	
1998	France	64	78.2	
2002	Japan/South Korea	64	66.8	
2006	Germany	64	148.5	
2010	South Africa	64	209.5	
2014	Brazil	64	291.6	
2018	Russia	64	297.6	
2022	Qatar	64	400	
2026	(Canada) (United States) (Mexico) North America	104	1.2b	

World Cup Final Match: U.S. viewership by year

The total number of viewers in the United States who watched the World Cup final match are as follows. English and Spanish channel viewership along with internet viewership are accounted for in these statistics. For context, the average number of viewers of that year's MLB best-of-seven World Series are also provided.

FIFA World Cup Final – viewers and ratings
Year	Location	Kickoff (U.S. EDT)	Viewers (millions)	Rating	Teams	Ref.	World Series viewers
1994	(United States) Pasadena	3:30 p.m.	18.1	9.5	Brazil vs. Italy		~~Canceled~~
1998	(France) Saint-Denis	3:00 p.m.	12.9	6.9	Brazil vs. France		20.3 million
2002	(Japan) Yokohama	6:00 a.m.	11.1	4.1	Germany vs. Brazil		19.3 million
2006	(Germany) Berlin	2:00 p.m.	17.0	8.6	Italy vs. France		15.8 million
2010	(South Africa) Johannesburg	3:30 p.m.	24.3	8.1	Netherlands vs. Spain		14.3 million
2014	(Brazil) Rio de Janeiro	3:00 p.m.	26.5	9.7	Germany vs. Argentina		13.5 million
2018	(Russia) Moscow	11:00 a.m.	17.4	TBD	France vs. Croatia		14.3 million
2022	(Qatar) Lusail	10:00 a.m.	22.3	9.2	Argentina vs. France		
2026	(United States) East Rutherford	03:00 p.m.	62.8	9.7	Spain vs. Argentina		

Other World Cup matches with most U.S. viewers

The following table shows the matches (other than a final match, which is shown in the table above) at the FIFA World Cup that scored the highest TV viewership. English and Spanish channel viewership (and internet viewership, where indicated) are accounted for in these statistics. All of the most-watched matches have taken place since 2010. The highest-rated U.S. World Cup matches have generally involved the U.S. national team.

Year	Viewers (millions)	Rating	Teams	Kickoff (U.S. EDT)	Stage	Channel	Ref.	Day
2026	50.1	9.8	United States vs. Belgium	8:00 p.m.	GS	Fox / Telemundo		Monday
2014	25.2	9.1	United States vs. Portugal	5:00 p.m.	GS	ESPN / Univision		Sunday
2026	24.9	9.1	United States vs. Paraguay	9:00 p.m.	GS	Fox / Telemundo		Friday
2014	24.9	9.8	United States vs. Belgium	3:00 p.m.	R16	ESPN / Univision		Tuesday
2022	20.0	7.3	United States vs. England	2:00 p.m.	GS	Fox / Telemundo		Friday
2010	19.4	8.2	United States vs. Ghana	1:30 p.m.	R16	ABC / Univision		Saturday
2014	19.0	7.0	United States vs. Ghana	5:00 p.m.	GS	ESPN / Univision		Monday
2010	17.1	7.5	United States vs. England	1:30 p.m.	GS	ABC / Univision		Saturday
2014	17.0	3.2	Mexico vs. Netherlands	11:00 a.m.	R16	ESPN / Univision		Sunday
2014	16.5	6.7	United States vs. Germany	11:00 a.m.	GS	ESPN / Univision		Thursday
2014	15.8	4.3	Argentina vs. Netherlands	3:00 p.m.	SF	ESPN / Univision		Wednesday
2022	15.5	6.4	United States vs. Iran	2:00 p.m.	GS	Fox / Telemundo		Tuesday

=== Non-World Cup matches on TV ===
The following table shows the most-viewed international men's team matches other than World Cup matches. Both English and Spanish channel viewership are accounted for in these statistics.

Year	Viewers (millions)	Teams	Event	Channels (viewers/rating)	Ref.
2016	9.9	Argentina vs. Chile	Copa America final	FS1 & Univision	
2013	9.7	United States vs. Mexico	World Cup qualifier	ESPN (1.9), Univision, Unimas	
2011	8.9	United States vs. Mexico	Gold Cup final	FSC (1.4), Univision	
2019	8.8	United States vs. Mexico	Gold Cup final	FS1, Univision	
2016	8.3	United States vs. Argentina	Copa America semifinal	FS1 & Univision & Fox Sports Go	
2013	7.7	Brazil vs. Spain	Confederations Cup final	ESPN (1.2), Univision	
2013	7.3	United States vs. Panama	Gold Cup final	Fox (1.7), Univision	
2014	7.2	United States vs. Mexico	Friendly	ESPN, Univision	
2013	7.2	United States vs. Mexico	World Cup qualifier	ESPN (1.6), Univision, Unimas	
2011	7.1	Mexico vs. Honduras	Gold Cup semifinal	Univision	
2015	6.8	Mexico vs. Jamaica	Gold Cup final	FS1 & Univision & UDN	

=== FIFA Women's World Cup on TV ===
FIFA Women's World Cup matches with highest U.S. viewership:

Year	Viewers (millions)	Rating	Teams	Stage	Channel
2015	26.7	12.9	United States vs. Japan	Final	Fox & Telemundo
1999	18.0	11.4	United States vs. China	Final	ABC
2019	15.9	8?	United States vs. Netherlands	Final	FoxSports & Telemundo
2011	13.5	7.4	United States vs. Japan	Final	ESPN
2015	8.4	3.0	United States vs. Germany	SF	Fox
2015	5.7	2.0	United States vs. China	QF	Fox
2015	5.0	2.0	United States vs. Nigeria	GS	Fox
1999	4.9	2.9	United States vs. Brazil	SF	ESPN
2015	4.7	1.8	United States vs. Colombia	R16	FS1
2015	4.2	1.5	United States vs. Sweden	GS	Fox
2011	3.9	2.3	United States vs. Brazil	QF	ESPN

=== Streaming services ===
Sports television networks like ESPN, Fox Sports, NBC Sports and beIN Sports offer streaming services to cable/satellite television subscribers. Over-the-top streaming services like Sling TV, Hulu, DirecTV Stream and YouTube TV also offer sports channels. In addition, Fox Soccer 2Go, Soccer on CBS Sports, and FuboTV are soccer-specific over-the-top streaming services. More recently, many matches have also become available on over-the-top streaming services such as Paramount+, ESPN+, and Peacock.

== Americans playing in foreign leagues ==
Since the early 1990s, several Americans have found opportunities playing soccer at the highest levels of foreign leagues. Among the first Americans to become regulars in foreign leagues were John Harkes at Sheffield Wednesday and Derby County in England, Eric Wynalda at Saarbrücken in Germany, and Kasey Keller at Millwall in England. Since then, other Americans have played for clubs that have participated in the knockout rounds of the Champions League and Europa League, such as Brad Friedel with Tottenham Hotspur; DaMarcus Beasley with PSV Eindhoven; and Christian Pulisic with Borussia Dortmund, Chelsea, and AC Milan.

== National teams of U.S. unincorporated territories ==
The following national teams of U.S. unincorporated territories compete in their corresponding regions. Their governing bodies are either members or associates in the corresponding regional federations. For all but American Samoa, players for these territories are, like most local residents, U.S. citizens. Natives of American Samoa are U.S. nationals, but not U.S. citizens (unless they have a citizen parent).

- American Samoa national football team
- Guam national football team
- Northern Mariana Islands national football team
- Puerto Rico national football team
- U.S. Virgin Islands national soccer team

== Attendances ==
The average attendance per league season and the club with the highest average attendance:

Season	League average	Best club	Best club average
2025	21,988	Atlanta United FC	43,992
2024	23,234	Atlanta United FC	46,831
2023	22,111	Atlanta United FC	47,526
2022	21,033	Atlanta United FC	47,116
2021	—	—	—
2020	—	—	—
2019	21,330	Atlanta United FC	52,510
2018	21,873	Atlanta United FC	53,002
2017	22,106	Atlanta United FC	48,200
2016	21,692	Seattle Sounders FC	42,636
2015	21,558	Seattle Sounders FC	44,247
2014	19,147	Seattle Sounders FC	43,734
2013	18,594	Seattle Sounders FC	44,038
2012	18,807	Seattle Sounders FC	43,144
2011	17,872	Seattle Sounders FC	38,496
2010	16,675	Seattle Sounders FC	36,173
2009	16,040	Seattle Sounders FC	30,942
2008	16,460	LA Galaxy	26,008
2007	16,770	LA Galaxy	24,252
2006	15,504	LA Galaxy	20,814
2005	15,108	LA Galaxy	24,204
2004	15,559	LA Galaxy	23,809
2003	14,898	LA Galaxy	21,983
2002	15,821	Colorado Rapids	20,690
2001	14,961	DC United	21,518
2000	13,756	LA Galaxy	20,400
1999	14,282	Columbus Crew	17,696
1998	14,312	LA Galaxy	21,784
1997	14,603	New England Revolution	21,298
1996	17,406	LA Galaxy	28,916

Sources: League pages on Wikipedia

== See also ==
- United States soccer league system
- List of soccer clubs in the United States
- Futsal in the United States
- Sports in the United States
- List of soccer stadiums in the United States

=== By city ===
- Soccer in Houston
- Soccer in Los Angeles
- Soccer in the New York metropolitan area
- Soccer in Seattle
- Soccer in St. Louis
