= FIFA Women's Club World Cup =

Women's association football competition

- Organiser(s): FIFA
- Founded: 2028; 2 years' time
- Region: International
- Teams: 19
- Related competitions: FIFA Women's Champions Cup
- 2028 FIFA Women's Club World Cup

The FIFA Women's Club World Cup is an international women's association football competition that is proposed by the Fédération Internationale de Football Association (FIFA), the sport's global governing body. The inaugural edition is scheduled to take place in January 2028.

== History ==
The International Women's Club Championship (IWCC) was an annual invitational tournament organised by the Japan Football Association and the L. League. The first edition took place in 2012 with participation from four teams: Canberra United (Australia), INAC Kobe Leonessa (Japan), NTV Beleza (Japan), and Olympique Lyonnais (France) – who were the defending UEFA Women's Champions League winners. In October 2012, L-League's senior executive, Yoshinori Taguchi, revealed that he intended the IWCC run for three years and expand to include more continental champions. It was also envisaged that FIFA would ultimately endorse the tournament as a female equivalent of the FIFA Club World Cup.

In October 2013, FIFA's executive committee heard a proposal from their Women's Football Task Force to explore the idea of an official FIFA Women's Club World Cup. The board of the Brazilian club São José, winner of the 2013 Copa Libertadores Femenina, went so far as to say that FIFA had approved the holding of an interclub tournament between the South American champions and 2012–13 UEFA Women's Champions League champions VfL Wolfsburg during 2014. The proposed match between the two continental champions, however, never progressed beyond the planning stages.

In 2015 the FIFA Women's Football Task Force again proposed the creation of the FIFA Women's Club World Cup. The Task Force also proposed an increase in teams and in development of competitions at confederation level in relation to the FIFA Women's Club World Cup.

A friendly played between Arsenal L.F.C. (FA Women's Cup holders) and Seattle Reign FC (NWSL Shield holders) on 26 May 2016 (finished with a draw of 1–1) at Memorial Stadium in Seattle was described as "a stepping stone to the grand idea of a FIFA Women's Club World Cup".

In 2017, Chief Women's Football Officer Sarai Bareman mentioned the possibility of a Women's Club World Cup, saying that they wanted "to be very careful about how we introduce it, when we introduce it and it has to include all regions. As you well know, not all regions are at the same development level but there's an amazing opportunity that exists, but we have to be very strategic and careful about how we do it".

During the closing press conference for the 2019 FIFA Women's World Cup, president Gianni Infantino outlined a proposal for the creation of the tournament "starting as soon as possible" as a step towards the future development of women's football. In December 2022, FIFA announced plans to establish a Women's Club World Cup, but the women's football calendar would remain unchanged until 2025.

In May 2024, FIFA announced that the inaugural edition of the tournament would take place in January and February 2026 and would feature 16 teams. It was confirmed that the competition would take place every four years. FIFA also announced that there will be a second global women's club competition similar to the men's FIFA Intercontinental Cup played on an annual basis in non-FIFA Women's Club World Cup years starting from 2027. The inaugural edition was later postponed to 2028 and expanded from 16 to 19 teams (with a play-in stage) while the second competition, the FIFA Women's Champions Cup was moved up to 2026.

== See also ==
- International Women's Club Championship
- Women's International Champions Cup
- CONMEBOL Libertadores Femenina
- UEFA Women's Champions League
- OFC Women's Champions League
- AFC Women's Champions League
- CAF Women's Champions League
- CONCACAF W Champions Cup
- Men's FIFA Club World Cup
