= 2028 FIFA Women's Club World Cup =

International women's soccer tournament

Tournament details
- Host country: United States
- Dates: January 5–30, 2028
- Teams: 19 (from 6 confederations)

The 2028 FIFA Women's Club World Cup will be the inaugural edition of the FIFA Women's Club World Cup, an international women's soccer club competition organized by FIFA, to be hosted by the United States. It is scheduled to be contested by 19 teams from January 5 to 30, 2028.

The tournament was originally scheduled to be played in early 2026 but was delayed by two years.

== Background and format ==
FIFA initially announced plans to establish a global women's club competition in May 2021. It would be structured similarly to the men's Club World Cup, which was scheduled to become a quadrennial tournament beginning with the 2025 edition. The FIFA Council approved the updated women's soccer calendar at the 74th FIFA Congress held in Bangkok in May 2024, which included the inaugural Women's Club World Cup in early 2026. The first edition of the quadrennial tournament was to be played in January and February 2026 and involve 16 teams.

In March 2025, the FIFA Council moved the inaugural Women's Club World Cup to 2028 and expanded it to 19 teams. They also created a new annual Women's Champions Cup to begin in the January/February 2026 slot and take place in the three years between Club World Cups. The two-year delay followed a lack of progress in announced plans for the inaugural tournament, which had yet to have a host, sponsors, or television broadcasters announced.

Six clubs will participate in the play-in stage where they are paired up. Each pair plays a match and the three winners will advance to the group stage to join 13 other teams who have qualified directly. In the group stage, the teams are put into four groups of four. The top two teams from each group advance to the quarter-finals.

== Hosts ==
In January 2026, it was reported that Qatar was in talks to host the tournament. However, the Qatar women's national team has not had an official match in 12 years and is not ranked by FIFA. Whether the team "still exists", Qatari officials from various agencies did not reply. It was considered that the choice of Qatar as hosts was likely to attract criticism and controversy based on Qatar's human rights record, especially on LGBTQ issues, as was the case with the 2022 World Cup.

On October 22, 2026, it was confirmed by FIFA that the United States would host the inaugural edition of the tournament.

== Slot allocation ==
Location of the teams qualified for the 2028 FIFA Women's Club World Cup

On October 22, 2026, the FIFA Council approved the slot allocation and key principles of the access list for the 2028 tournament after a "close consultation with the confederations and with the goal of striking the right balance between competitive quality and global representation". The principles were as follows, considering competitions completed during a four-year period from 2024 to 2027:

- UEFA (six slots): access granted to the winners of the UEFA Women's Champions League, plus further clubs to be determined by a club ranking. A restriction of two clubs per European FIFA Member Association (MA) will be applied, except when more than two clubs from the same MA have won the competition.
- AFC, CAF, CONCACAF, CONMEBOL (three slots each) and OFC (one slot): access granted to the highest-ranked clubs, as determined by a club ranking, between the champions of the confederations' premier club competitions. Should a club win multiple editions of the premier club competition, additional places will be allocated by a club ranking. Should a confederation hold fewer than four editions of its premier club competition between 2024 and 2027, a club ranking will be used to grant access to the remaining slot(s).

The slot allocation for the inaugural edition will be as follows:

| Confederation | Direct slots | Play-in slots |
|---|---|---|
| AFC | 2 | 1 |
| CAF | 2 | 1 |
| CONCACAF | 2 | 1 |
| CONMEBOL | 2 | 1 |
| OFC | 0 | 1 |
| UEFA | 5 | 1 |
| Total | 13 | 6 |

== Teams ==
=== Qualification ===
The following teams have qualified for the tournament:

AFC (3)

- (China) Wuhan Jiangda
- (North Korea) Naegohyang

CAF (3)

- (Democratic Republic of the Congo) TP Mazembe
- (Morocco) AS FAR

CONCACAF (3)

- (United States) Gotham FC
- (Mexico) América

CONMEBOL (3)

- (Brazil) Corinthians
- (Brazil) Cruzeiro

OFC (1)

UEFA (6)

- (Spain) Barcelona
- (England) Arsenal

== Reception ==
The Women's Super League raised concerns about the decision to schedule the tournament in January. With one or more English teams expected to participate, fixtures for the 2027–28 season would have to be rescheduled to accommodate the FIFA tournament. Fixture rescheduling is already restricted as the season is bookended by the 2027 FIFA Women's World Cup and the 2028 Summer Olympics. The congested season also raises concerns over player welfare.

In response to the FIFA Forward Enterprise proposal, which would have seen a stake in FIFA's tournament and commercial operations sold to private equity, European Football Clubs wrote a letter on 31 July 2026 to Mattias Grafström, the secretary-general of FIFA. EFC stated that they would not allow any of their member clubs to participate in future Men's and Women's Club World Cups unless they established a separate commercial joint venture for the competitions "with exclusive authority over, among other things, all commercial and operational matters"; FFE was withdrawn the following morning.

== See also ==
- 2027 FIFA Women's Champions Cup
- 2029 FIFA Club World Cup
