= United States Soccer Federation State Soccer Association =

Local governing bodies of soccer in the United States

The United States Soccer Federation's State Soccer Associations are the local governing bodies of soccer in the United States. State Soccer Associations exist to govern all aspects of soccer in the United States. They are responsible for administering club and player registration as well as promoting development amongst those bodies and referees .

Most of the State Soccer Associations align roughly along state boundaries, although some of the more populated states have multiple soccer associations broken by geography (i.e. California, New York, and Texas).

The state soccer associations often host their own statewide cups and premier leagues for amateur outfits, often as a mechanism of regional qualification for the U.S. Open Cup competition.

== List of state soccer associations ==
The following state associations are affiliated with the United States Soccer Federation as the state association.

Association	Founded	Main State Cup
Alabama	1980	Alabama Adult State Cup
Alaska	1995	
Arizona	1966	
Arkansas	1979	
California North	1902	
California South	1974	
Colorado	1978	
Connecticut	1913	
Delaware	1974	
Florida	1974	
(Georgia (U.S. state)) Georgia	1968	
Hawaii	1975	
Idaho	1980	
Illinois	1916	
Indiana	1978	
Iowa		
Kansas	1950	
Kentucky	1982	
Louisiana	1985	
Maine		
Maryland	1924	
Massachusetts		
Michigan		
Minnesota	1957	
Mississippi		
Missouri		
Montana		
Nebraska	1969	
Nevada		
New Hampshire	1977	
New Jersey	1913	
New Mexico		
(New York (state)) Eastern New York	1913	
(New York (state)) Western New York	1913	
North Carolina	1984	
North Dakota	1985	
Ohio		
Oklahoma	1967	
Oregon		
Eastern Pennsylvania		
Western Pennsylvania		
Rhode Island		
South Carolina		
South Dakota		
Tennessee	1976	
Northern Texas		
Southern Texas		
Utah		
Vermont		
Virginia	1977	
(Washington (state)) Washington		
West Virginia		
Wisconsin		
Wyoming		

== See also ==
- United States Soccer Federation
- Soccer in the United States
- County Football Association, a similar concept in England
