= List of USASA affiliated leagues =

The United States Adult Soccer Association (USASA) is a national organization and sanctioning body for amateur soccer in the United States. It consists of 54 state organizations as well as regional, national and state leagues.

There are numerous adult leagues that are affiliated with the USASA. These leagues are mostly independent of each other, and the division rankings cannot be reliably compared between state or local organizations. There are affiliated leagues and national leagues, in which the national leagues operate leagues constructed out of localized conferences, while multi-state and regional leagues operated leagues that focus on competition with less emphasize on national appeal. USASA has over 250,000 adult members within its leagues and teams.

== National affiliates ==
- The League for Clubs (TLfC)
- National Premier Soccer League (NPSL)
- Women's Premier Soccer League (WPSL)
- United Women's Soccer (UWS)

== Multi-state Leagues ==
- American Premier Soccer League (APSL)
- Cascadia Premier League (CPL)
- Elite Development Program
- Mountain Premier League (MPL)
- National Independent Soccer Association (NISA)
- West Coast Soccer Association (WCSA)

== Elite amateur leagues ==
The elite league membership program is for the promotion of the top USASA leagues across the country. These leagues are part of the USASA structure as national leagues, regional leagues or members of a USASA state association.

| League | State | Region |
|---|---|---|
| Buffalo & District Soccer League | Western New York | Region I |
| Cosmopolitan Soccer League | New York City | Region I |
| DC Premier League | Washington, D.C. | Region I |
| Long Island Soccer Football League | Long Island | Region I |
| United Soccer League of Pennsylvania | Pennsylvania | Region I |
| Rochester District Soccer League | Upstate New York | Region I |
| Maryland Super Soccer League | Central Maryland | Region I |
| Washington Premier League | Washington metropolitan area | Region I |
| Michigan Premier Soccer League | Michigan | Region II |
| Atlanta District Amateur Soccer League | Atlanta, Georgia | Region III |
| Florida Suncoast Soccer League | Florida | Region III |
| Colorado Super League | Colorado | Region IV |
| Evergreen Premier League | Washington | Region IV |
| Northwest Premier League | Washington | Region IV |
| San Francisco Soccer Football League | Northern California | Region IV |
| Utah Premiership Soccer League | Utah | Region IV |
| Wasatch Women's Soccer League | Salt Lake City, Utah | Region IV |

== Regional leagues ==
=== Region I ===
The first region of the four USASA regions are teams located in the Northeastern and Mid-Atlantic regions of the United States. The region includes the following state soccer associations:

- Connecticut State Soccer Association

- Adult Soccer League of Connecticut
- Connecticut Adult Recreational Soccer League
- Connecticut Soccer League
- CSSA U-23 Summer Soccer League
- Shoreline Adult Soccer League (30+)]
- Southern New England Adult Soccer League (40+)

- Delaware Soccer Association
- Eastern New York State Soccer Association
- Eastern Pennsylvania Soccer Association
- Maryland State Soccer Association
- Massachusetts Adult State Soccer Association
- Metropolitan DC-VA Soccer Association
- New Hampshire Soccer Association
- New Jersey Soccer Association

- Garden State Soccer League

- Pennsylvania West Soccer Association
- Rhode Island Soccer Association
- Vermont State Soccer Association
- West Virginia Soccer Association
- Western New York Soccer Association

=== Region II ===
==== Illinois ====
- Central Illinois Soccer League
- Chicago Champions SL
- Chicago SL
- Illinois Women's SL
- Kankakee Premier SL
- Metropolitan AH SL
- Metropolitan SL
- National Soccer League
- Polish Highlanders SL
- Polish SL
- Premier SL Chicagoland
- Recreational Adult and Youth Soccer Association
- Southern Illinois Adult Soccer League
- Tricounty SL O40
- Westside Premier SL
- Windy City Wanderers FC
- World Soccer League

==== Indiana ====
- Central Indiana Adult Soccer League
- Central Indiana Women's Soccer League
- Ft. Wayne Adult Soccer League
- Latino Americana Sport Club
- Northwest Indiana Women's League
- Northwest Indiana Old Boys League
- Premier Soccer League
- Lafayette Soccer League

==== Iowa ====
- Cedar Valley Adult Soccer Association
- Central Iowa Co-ed Soccer League
- Dubuque Soccer Club
- Latin America Soccer League
- Latino Unidos
- Liga Latina de Futbol

==== Kansas ====
- Dodge City
- Garden City
- Kansas City
- Leavenworth Adult League
- Johnson County Adult Soccer League
- Kansas Rush Adult Soccer League
- Kansas Soccer League Wichita
- Lawrence Adult Soccer League
- Emporia Soccer League

==== Kentucky ====
- Greater Louisville Soccer League
- Kentucky Amateur Soccer League
- Latino's Soccer League
- Lexington Amateur
- Lexington Women's Soccer League
- Louisville Soccer Amateur League
- Organization de Futbol Independent Soccer League
- Woodford Adult Soccer League

==== Michigan ====
- Ann Arbor Premier Development League
- Ann Arbor Soccer Association
- Blossomland Soccer League
- Great Lakes Women Soccer League
- Kalamazoo Area Soccer League
- Metro Detroit Soccer League
- Michigan United Soccer League
- Michigan Premier Soccer League
- Mid-Michigan Soccer League
- Midland Soccer Club Adult League

==== Minnesota ====
- American Champions League
- Duluth Amateur Soccer League/Duluth Women's Soccer League
- Minnesota Amateur Soccer League
- Minnesota Recreational Soccer League
- Minnesota Women's Soccer League
- Southern Minnesota Amateur Soccer Association

==== Nebraska ====
- Nebraska Men's Soccer League
- Omaha Latino Soccer League
- South Omaha Soccer League

==== Ohio ====
===== North =====
- Akron Premier League (APL)
- North Ohio Amateur Soccer Association (NOASA)
- North Coast Soccer League
- Northwest Ohio Champions League (defunct)
- Northern Ohio Soccer League (NOSL)

===== South =====
- Columbus Premier Soccer League
- Dayton Amateur Soccer League
- Cincinnati Champions League

==== Wisconsin ====
- Milwaukee Premier League
- Northern Wisconsin Soccer League
- Wisconsin Primary Amateur Soccer League

=== Region III ===
==== Florida ====
- Central Florida Soccer League
- Florida Gold Coast League
- Florida Suncoast Soccer League

==== Louisiana ====
- ISLANO (International Soccer League Association New Orleans)

==== North Carolina ====
- Triangle Adult Soccer League
- Metrolina Adult Soccer League- Charlotte

==== South Carolina ====
- Charleston Soccer League

==== Texas ====
- Texas Premier Soccer League
- North Texas Premier Soccer Association

=== Region IV ===
==== Alaska State Soccer Association ====
- Soccer Alaska (Anchorage)
- Fairbanks Soccer Association (Fairbanks)
- Capital City Soccer League (Juneau)

==== Arizona State Soccer Association ====
- Arizona Women's Soccer League
- Sierra Vista Soccer League
- Sierra Vista Women's Soccer League
- Tucson Metro Soccer League
- Tucson Women's Soccer League

==== California Soccer Association - North ====
- Alameda County Over 35 Soccer League
- Central California Soccer League
- Fiji US Sports Soccer League
- Liga Comunitaria Chapín de SF
- Marin Soccer League
- Monterey Peninsula Soccer League
- Palo Alto Soccer League
- San Francisco Soccer Football League
- Sacramento Adult Soccer League
- San Joaquin Soccer League

==== California Soccer Association - South ====
- Adult Soccer League of Simi Valley
- City of Hawaiian Gardens Soccer League
- Laguna Niguel Football Association (LNFA)
- Los Angeles Municipal Soccer League
- Oxnard Soccer Association
- San Diego County Soccer League
- South Bay Sports
- United Premier Veterans Soccer League

==== Colorado State Soccer Association ====
- Colorado Mountain United Soccer League
- Denver Kickers Sport Club League
- High Plains Coed Soccer League

==== Hawaii Soccer Association ====
- Co-ed Soccer Association of Hawaii
- Hawaii Ranger Soccer League
- Major Island Soccer Organization
- Kauai COED
- Kauai Soccer Association
- Maui Soccer Association
- Valley Isle COED Soccer League

==== Idaho State Soccer Association ====
- Idaho Falls Adult Soccer Association
- Lega Azteca
- Liga de Fot-Bol Valle Magico
- Primetime Co-Ed Soccer League
- Southern Idaho Soccer League

==== Utah Soccer Association ====
- Co-ed
- Men's Open (GSLSL)
- Men's Over-30 (FSL)
- Men's Over-35 (VSL)
- Men's Over-40 (OHSL)
