= United States Soccer Federation =

Governing body of soccer in the United States

Coordinates: 41.8578°N 87.6205°W

CONCACAF
- Short name: USSF
- Founded: April 5, 1913; 113 years ago
- Headquarters: 910 Veterans Pkwy; Fayetteville, Georgia, U.S.
- FIFA affiliation: August 2, 1913 (provisional); June 27, 1914 (full member)
- CONCACAF affiliation: September 18, 1961 (original member)
- President: Cindy Parlow Cone
- Website: ussoccer.com

The United States Soccer Federation (USSF), commonly referred to as U.S. Soccer, is a 501(c)(3) nonprofit organization and the official governing body of soccer in the United States. It is a full member of FIFA and governs American soccer at the international, professional, and amateur levels, including: the men's and women's national teams, Major League Soccer (MLS), the National Women's Soccer League (NWSL), youth organizations, as well as the beach soccer, futsal, Paralympic, and deaf national teams. U.S. Soccer sanctions referees and soccer tournaments for most soccer leagues in the United States. It also administers and operates the U.S. Open Cup and SheBelieves Cup. U.S. Soccer is headquartered in and has a consolidated training facility in the Atlanta suburb of Fayetteville, Georgia.

== History ==
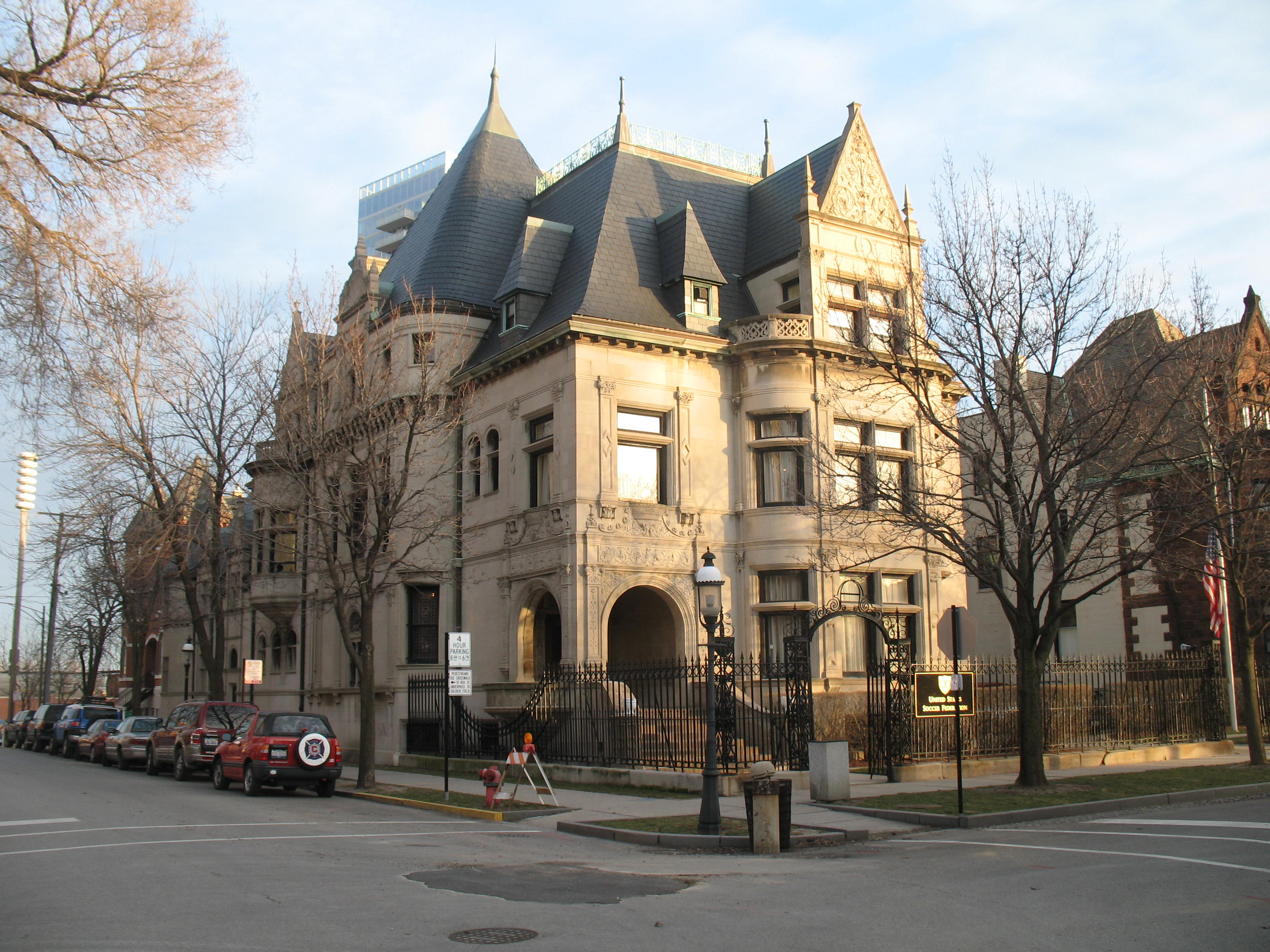
Former United States Soccer Federation headquarters building, known as the Soccer House, 1801 South Prairie Avenue in Chicago

The United States Soccer Federation was originally established as the United States Football Association on April 5, 1913, at a meeting held in the Astor House Hotel in Lower Manhattan, New York City. Shortly after its creation, on August 15, 1913, the USFA was provisionally accepted as a member association of the Fédération Internationale de Football Association (FIFA), becoming one of the earlier federations to affiliate and the first from the North and Central American region to join FIFA's global governing structure. At the FIFA Congress in Oslo, Norway, on June 24, 1914, this provisional status was elevated to full membership.

Over the decades, the organization underwent several name changes reflecting both the evolution of the sport domestically and linguistic differences in how “football” and “soccer” were used in the United States in comparison to the rest of the world. In 1945, the word “soccer” was formally incorporated into its title — becoming the United States Soccer Football Association — as the term “football” in the U.S. increasingly referred to American football rather than association football. Later, in 1974, the federation dropped “football” entirely and adopted its current name, the United States Soccer Federation, often abbreviated as U.S. Soccer.

Beyond FIFA membership, the United States Soccer Federation was a founding member of the Confederation of North, Central America and Caribbean Association Football (CONCACAF) when the confederation was established in 1961. CONCACAF was formed through the merger of the North American Football Union (NAFU) and the Football Confederation of Central America and the Caribbean (CCCF), creating a unified governing body for football in the region and expanding organized competition and development across member associations.

=== Project 2010 ===
Project 2010 was a blueprint that United States Soccer Federation executives created in 1998 to ensure that the U.S. men's national soccer team could become a plausible contender to win the FIFA World Cup by 2010. The Q-Report, the jumping-off point for Project 2010, was written by Carlos Queiroz. The $50 million development plan was started just before the start of the 1998 FIFA World Cup. While referred to less often in recent years, Project 2010 did propagate two programs which continued for some time to help produce professional standard talent: Generation Adidas (previously called Project-40 when sponsored by Nike) and U.S. Soccer's U-17 residency camp in Bradenton, Florida. However, the residency camp closed in 2017 due to the proliferation of U.S. Development Academy programs.

=== International tournaments hosted ===
U.S. Soccer has been instrumental in bringing international soccer tournaments to the United States, significantly influencing the sport's visibility and popularity domestically, such as when the federation successfully bid for the FIFA World Cup and hosted it in 1994. The edition broke attendance records for the tournament and provided a major catalyst for growth in the sport nationwide, and its success contributed directly to the founding of MLS in 1996. Alongside Canada and Mexico, the United States was a co-host of the 2026 FIFA World Cup. The tournament further broke attendance records, with nearly 7 million people attending its matches.

The US has also hosted two editions of the FIFA Women's World Cup: in 1999 and 2003, both of which helped elevate the women's game to new heights in the United States and around the world.

U.S. Soccer also served as the organizing host for the Olympic soccer tournaments during the 1984 edition (held in Los Angeles) and the 1996 edition, hosted in Atlanta and the first time a women's soccer tournament was held, integrating the sport into these high-profile global multi-sport events.

=== Headquarters and national training center ===
Originally based in Colorado Springs, Colorado, U.S. Soccer headquarters were moved to Chicago in 1991 under the leadership of former secretary general, Hank Steinbrecher From 1991 to 2022, the organization was based out of U.S. Soccer House, two refurbished mansions at 1801 South Prairie Avenue in Chicago. In 2022, they moved to temporary quarters at 303 East Wacker Street in Chicago in anticipation of a permanent relocation to new facilities in Fayetteville, Georgia.

In 2003, U.S. Soccer opened its National Training Center at Dignity Health Sports Park (then named Home Depot Center) in Carson, California. The $130 million facility includes a soccer-specific stadium, home to the MLS team Los Angeles Galaxy. Additionally, four grass soccer fields, a FieldTurf soccer field, and a general training area are specifically dedicated to U.S. Soccer. Both the senior and youth men's and women's U.S. national teams hold regular camps at Dignity Health Sports Park.

U.S. Soccer was also exploring the possibility of building the National Training and Coaching Development Center in Kansas City, Kansas. On April 9, 2015, the Development Center received final approval from the local governments. U.S. Soccer agreed to a 20-year lease, with the project set to break ground in 2016 and finishing some time in 2017.

In September 2023, U.S. Soccer announced they were moving from Chicago to a new headquarters and training center south of Atlanta, which will be partially funded by Arthur Blank, co-founder of The Home Depot and owner of the NFL's Atlanta Falcons and MLS's Atlanta United. In December 2023, U.S. Soccer announced they had chosen a site for the new national training center in Fayette County, Georgia. The 200-acre (81 ha) site is scheduled to be developed and opened before the 2026 FIFA World Cup; it is in the same metropolitan area as the headquarters of Coca-Cola, one of the founding partners for the training center. The new training center will be named after Arthur Blank to honor his involvement in the move. The National Training Center and headquarters opened on May 7, 2026.

== Logos ==
The first logo used by the team and the federation, from 1913 to 1924

Logo used from 1924 to 1929

Logo used from 1930 to 1934

Logo used from 1934 to 1936

Logo used from 1936 to 1945

Logo used from 1945 to 1967

Logo used at the time of the 1950 FIFA World Cup

Logo used from 1967 to 1974

Logo used from 1974 to 1978

Crest used by the team from 1978 to 1992

== Organization and governance ==
U.S. Soccer serves as the official governing body for soccer in the United States, and it is tasked with organizing national teams, sanctioning professional and amateur leagues, overseeing refereeing and coaching standards, and promoting the game at all levels across the country working closely with state and local level organizations for youth and amateur leagues. Throughout its history, U.S. Soccer has presided over a significant expansion of soccer's popularity and infrastructure, from grassroots youth participation to professional leagues such as Major League Soccer (MLS), and the national teams, youth and senior.

The federation has also established and supported national competitions, such as the Lamar Hunt U.S. Open Cup, established in 1913 (as the National Challenge Cup), which is the oldest ongoing national soccer competition in the United States, open to all professional and amateur teams. The U.S. Open Cup later was renamed in honor of Lamar Hunt, a key figure in the development of American sports as a whole.

A board of directors governs and administers the affairs of U.S. Soccer. Cindy Parlow Cone, former 1999 FIFA Women's World Cup champion and long-time U.S. Soccer administrator, became president in March 2020 following the resignation of Carlos Cordeiro. JT Batson was named chief executive officer and secretary general in September 2022.

U.S. Soccer members are individuals and affiliate organizations. The national council is the representative membership body of the federation. It elects the president and vice president, amends the bylaws, approves the budgets, decides on policies adopted by the board, and affirms actions of the Board. The non-profit organization is a member of the worldwide soccer body FIFA and the North American soccer body CONCACAF, and also has a relationship with the U.S. Olympic Committee and the International Olympic Committee.

The federation convenes an annual meeting, usually held in February. Every four years, the annual meeting's attendees hold an election for the federation's president and vice president.

=== Members of the U.S. Soccer Federation ===
USSF recognizes the following members:

==== Professional councils ====
- Major League Soccer (MLS)
- National Independent Soccer Association (NISA)
- National Women's Soccer League (NWSL)
- United Soccer League (USL)

==== Adult councils ====
- United States Adult Soccer Association (USASA)
- United States Specialty Sports Association (USSSA)

==== Youth councils ====
- American Youth Soccer Organization (AYSO)
- Soccer Association for Youth (SAY)
- United States Specialty Sports Association (USSSA)
- United States Youth Soccer Association (US Youth Soccer)
- US Club Soccer

==== USSF state soccer associations ====
- Alabama Soccer Association
- Arizona Soccer Association
- Arizona State Soccer Association
- Arkansas State Soccer Association
- Colorado Soccer Association
- Connecticut State Soccer Association
- Eastern New York State Soccer Association
- Hawaii Soccer Association
- North Texas Soccer Association
- Utah Soccer Association

==== Other affiliate members ====
- American Amputee Soccer Association
- Armed Forces Sports Council
- United Soccer Coaches
- United States Futsal Federation
- United States of America Deaf Soccer Association (USA Deaf Soccer)
- United States Power Soccer Association (USPSA)
- United States Specialty Sports Association
- U.S. Soccer Foundation

== National teams ==
=== U.S. men's national team ===
The United States men's national team was assembled in 1885 to play Canada in the first international match held outside the United Kingdom. The team was invited to the inaugural FIFA World Cup in 1930 and qualified for the World Cup in 1934, finishing third place (semifinals) in 1930 out of 13 teams participating. In 1950 the United States scored one of its most surprising victories with a 1–0 win over heavily favored England, who were amongst the world's best sides at the time. The United States did not reach another World Cup until an upstart team qualified for the 1990 World Cup with the "goal heard around the world" scored by Paul Caligiuri against Trinidad and Tobago, which started the modern era of soccer in the United States.

The United States hosted the 1994 FIFA World Cup, setting total and average attendance records that still stand, including drawing 94,194 fans to the final. The United States made a surprising run to the second round in 1994, but finished last among the 32 teams in the 1998 World Cup. The tournament was marred by poor team chemistry and leadership, which led head coach Steve Sampson to resign. Sampson was replaced by Bruce Arena, a two-time MLS Cup winner with D.C. United, in 1998. Arena led a mix of veterans and youth players to a quarterfinal appearance in the 2002 World Cup, defeating rivals Mexico in the Round of 16 before losing to eventual runners-up Germany.

At the 2006 edition of the tournament, the U.S. failed to qualify for the knockout round with two losses and a draw in the group stage. Arena's contract was not renewed following the tournament; former assistant Bob Bradley was hired as head coach in 2007. The U.S. qualified for the 2010 FIFA World Cup in South Africa by winning the CONCACAF qualifying tournament. At the World Cup, the Americans were undefeated in the group stage but were eliminated in the round of 16 by a loss to Ghana. Bradley was dismissed following the 2011 Gold Cup, which the United States lost 4–2 to Mexico in the final.

The U.S. entered the 2014 FIFA World Cup under Jürgen Klinsmann, who had led Germany to third place in the 2006 World Cup and had lived in the United States for several years. Klinsmann recruited dual national players, particularly Germans with American heritage, and favored youth in his rosters; this included his exclusion of Landon Donovan from the World Cup roster. The U.S. finished second in the "Group of Death" (eventual champion Germany, Ghana, and Portugal) and advanced to the round of 16, where they lost to Belgium in extra time after goalkeeper Tim Howard's 16 saves set a World Cup record. Klinsmann was retained as head coach for the 2018 World Cup qualifying cycle, but was fired in November 2016 after the team had lost the opening two matches of the final qualifying round. Bruce Arena was hired to replace Klinsmann, but the United States finished fifth and were unable to qualify for the 2018 FIFA World Cup. It was the first time the U.S. had failed to qualify for the World Cup since 1986.

Arena resigned following the qualification campaign and was replaced by Dave Sarachan, who was the interim coach during the search for a permanent head coach. Sarachan's year-long tenure included the introduction of several young players to replace veterans who had resigned following the 2018 qualification cycle. Columbus Crew coach Gregg Berhalter was selected and hired as head coach in December 2018; his rosters rely mostly on younger players who had played in MLS academies or were developed by teams in Europe. During qualification for the 2022 FIFA World Cup, the United States had rosters with an average age of under 24 years old; the team finished 7–3–4 during the final round and qualified for the World Cup. Berhalter used the second-youngest roster at the World Cup with only DeAndre Yedlin retained from a previous World Cup team. The United States finished second in their group with a win against Iran and ties with England and Wales. The team were eliminated in the round of 16 by the Netherlands.

Berhalter's contract was renewed in June 2023 following an investigation by U.S. Soccer into allegations of domestic abuse from a 1991 incident. During his absence from the team, two assistant coaches served as interim coaches. B.J. Callaghan, the second interim coach, led the United States to a second CONCACAF Nations League title but failed to reach the final of the 2023 CONCACAF Gold Cup. Berhalter was fired in July 2024 following the team's group-stage exit at the 2024 Copa América and replaced in September 2024 by Mauricio Pochettino, an Argentinian manager with experience in European leagues.

The United States will co-host the 2026 FIFA World Cup alongside Canada and Mexico after their joint bid was selected over Morocco by FIFA in 2018. The tournament will be the first World Cup to feature 48 teams. The United States will also host the 2024 Copa América, the championship of South American teams; it will be the second Copa América to be played in the United States following the Copa América Centenario in 2016. The United States did not automatically qualify as hosts, but earned a spot through their performance in the 2023–24 CONCACAF Nations League.

=== U.S. women's national team ===
The logo used by the United States women's national soccer team. The four stars represent the four FIFA Women's World Cup titles won by the team, the most of any country.

Having won four FIFA Women's World Cup tournaments—1991, 1999, 2015, and 2019—the United States is considered the most successful in international women's soccer. The team finished second in 2011 and third in 1995, 2003, and 2007. It has won Olympic gold medals at the 1996, 2004, 2008, 2012, and 2024 Summer Olympics. In addition, it has won ten titles at the Algarve Cup and nine at the CONCACAF Women's Championship, the qualifying tournament for the FIFA Women's World Cup.

The inaugural FIFA Women's World Cup was held in 1991 in China. The U.S. women's national team was the first team to win the prize after beating Norway in the final.

In 1999, the United States hosted the FIFA Women's World Cup for the first time. During their tournament run, the women's national team established a new level of popularity for the women's game, culminating in a final against China that drew 90,185 fans, an all-time attendance record for a women's sports event, to a sold-out Rose Bowl. After neither team scored in regulation or extra time, the final went to a penalty shootout, which the United States won 5–4. The celebration by Brandi Chastain after she converted the winning penalty, in which she took off her shirt, is one of the more famous images in U.S. women's sports, and American sports in general.

=== Youth national teams ===
U.S. Soccer Federation oversees and promotes the development of 14 youth national teams:

- U.S. under-23 men
- U.S. under-23 women
- U.S. under-20 men
- U.S. under-20 women
- U.S. under-19 men
- U.S. under-19 women
- U.S. under-18 men
- U.S. under-18 Women
- U.S. under-17 men
- U.S. under-17 women
- U.S. under-16 boys
- U.S. under-16 girls
- U.S. under-15 boys
- U.S. under-15 girls

U.S. Soccer Federation ceased operations on its youth national team programming except for the U-23, U-20, and U-17 teams on the men's side and the U-20 and U-17 teams on the women's side, due to the COVID-19 pandemic, in April 2020.

== Extended national teams ==
The USSF supervises nine extended national teams across adaptive and alternative disciplines of soccer. These teams focus on beach soccer, futsal, cerebral palsy (CP) soccer, deaf soccer, and power soccer (co-ed).

The extended teams are:

- Beach soccer: U.S. Men's Beach Soccer National Team and U.S. Women's Beach Soccer National Team
- Futsal: U.S. Men's Futsal National Team and U.S. Women's Futsal National Team
- Cerebral palsy soccer: U.S. Men's CP National Team and U.S. Women's CP National Team
- Deaf soccer: U.S. Men's Deaf National Team and U.S. Women's Deaf National Team
- Power soccer: U.S. Power Soccer National Team (co-ed)

These teams compete in international competitions under their respective governing bodies (e.g., Beach Soccer Worldwide for beach soccer, IFCPF for CP soccer, IF Deaf Sports for deaf soccer, FIFA for futsal, and FIPFA for power soccer). U.S. Soccer provides oversight, funding, and development support. The federation continues to highlight the program through events like annual player awards and training camps.

- Beach soccer:
  - The men's team has qualified for the FIFA Beach Soccer World Cup seven times (2005–2024 editions), with best results in the group stage; they are strong regionally, winning the CONCACAF Beach Soccer Championship in 2006, 2007 (joint), 2013, and 2023.
- Futsal:
  - The men's team has appeared in the FIFA Futsal World Cup multiple times (e.g., 1989–2008 editions), with best results reaching the second group stage; they have not qualified recently.
- Cerebral palsy soccer:
  - The men's team has competed at IFCPF World Cups and Paralympic-related events, with a seventh-place finish at the 2024 IFCPF World Cup. The women's team won the inaugural IFCPF Women's World Cup in 2022.
- Deaf soccer:
  - The women's team is highly successful, winning multiple Deaflympics gold medals (2005, 2009, 2013, 2021, 2025) and World Deaf Football Championships (2012, 2016, 2023), with an undefeated or near-undefeated record in major events. The men's team has participated but with fewer podium finishes.
- Power soccer:
  - The team has been successful, winning the FIPFA Powerchair Football World Cup in 2007 and 2011, finishing runners-up in 2017, and taking third place in 2023; they maintain a strong record in Americas Cup events (perfect in recent editions).

== Coaches and technical staff ==
As of January 8, 2026

Men's coaches

Level	Name	Since	Ref.
Senior	(Argentina) Mauricio Pochettino	September 2024	
Under-23	(United States) Steve Cherundolo	July 2026	
Under-20	(United States) Rob Valentino	January 2026	
Under-19	(Costa Rica) Gonzalo Segares	May 2025	
Under-18	(United States) Jeremy Hall	January 2026	
Under-17	(United States) Alex Aldaz	October 2021	
Under-16	Paul Simmons	January 2026	
Under-15	(United States) Ross Brady	February 2025	

Women's coaches

Level	Name	Since	Ref.
Senior	(England) Emma Hayes	May 2024	
Under-23			
Under-20	(England) Vicky Jepson	May 2025	
Under-19	(United States) Carrie Kveton	May 2023	
Under-18			
Under-17	(United States) Katie Schoepfer	May 2023	
Under-16	(United States) Ciara Crinion	April 2025	
Under-15	(United States) Vanessa Mann	April 2025	

Extended teams' coaches

Level	Name	Since	Ref.
Men's beach	(Brazil) Marcelo Mendes	December 2025	
Women's beach	(United States) Morgan Church	May 2021	
Men's CP	(Scotland) Stuart Sharp	2014	
Women's CP	(United States) Tricia Taliaferro	2022	
Men's deaf	(United States) David Kunitz	2011	
Women's deaf	(United States) Amy Griffin	2017	
Men's futsal	(Brazil) Hewerton Moreira	August 2023	
Women's futsal	(Brazil) Diego Burato	January 2025	
Co-ed power	(United States) Tracy Mayer	October 2022	

Technical staff

Level	Name	Since	Ref.
Sporting director	(Wales) Matt Crocker	April 2023	
Vice president of sporting	(United States) Oguchi Onyewu	May 2023	
Director of extended national teams	(United States) Jim Moorhouse		
Director of talent identification – boys	(United States) Garrett Biller	March 2024	
Director of talent identification – girls	(United States) Nicole Lukic	March 2024	
Director of coaching education	(Belgium) Barry Pauwels		

== Refereeing staff ==
As of July 13, 2025 https://www.ussoccer.com/refereeing/department

Referee Department Staff

Name	Position
Kari Seitz	Senior vice president of refereeing
Mat Cheeseman Jared Mundie	Senior manager, refereeing operations
Alicia Owens	Senior coordinator, refereeing operations
Geneita Revear	Manager, refereeing operations

Refereeing education and development staff

Name	Position
Nathan Magill	Director, refereeing education & development
Kara Honthumb	Manager, refereeing education & development
Ryan Rudolph	Instructional designer
Jeffery Solis	Manager, refereeing talent pathways
Ricky Serota	Regional refereeing lead

== Professional leagues ==
The USSF defines men and women professional leagues in three divisions, Division I, II, and III, which is often referred to as the American Soccer Pyramid. Despite the growth of men's and women's professional soccer in the United States in the last few decades, by far the largest category of soccer in the United States, at least in terms of participation, is youth soccer. Though organized locally by organizations all over the United States, there are two main youth soccer organizations working nationwide through affiliated local associations. The United States Youth Soccer Association boasts over three million players between the ages of 5 and 19, while the American Youth Soccer Organization has more than 300,000 players between the ages of 4 and 19. This makes soccer one of the most played sports by children in the United States.

=== Men ===
As of 2026, Major League Soccer is the only Division 1 soccer league. The 2026 season included 27 teams in the U.S. and 3 in Canada. The league began an aggressive expansion in 2017 with the goal of adding at least eight clubs. That effort has resulted in the addition of the following ten clubs: Atlanta United FC (2017), Minnesota United FC (2017), Los Angeles FC (2018), FC Cincinnati (2019), Inter Miami CF (2020), Nashville SC (2020), Austin FC (2021), Charlotte FC (2022), St. Louis City SC (2023), and San Diego FC (2025). The league operates as a single-entity league, which means MLS, and not the individual teams, holds the contracts on players.

On February 13, 2025, USL announced a plan to create a new Division 1 league named USL Premier to compete alongside MLS. to start in 2028. As of 2025, four USL clubs have officially announced their application: Louisville City FC, North Carolina FC, Pittsburgh Riverhounds SC and Sporting Club Jaxsonville. Detroit City FC and Sacramento Republic FC have initiated stadium projects with the intent to meet the capacity requirements, while 3 additional USLC clubs, Birmingham Legion FC, Miami FC, and Oakland Roots SC, meet both the market population and capacity requirements. In addition to promoting within, the USL is actively recruiting and accepting applications for additional clubs outside of its system.

The only sanctioned Division II men's outdoor soccer league is USL Championship (USLC). The USL Championship was sanctioned as Division III league from 2011 to 2016 before becoming provisionally sanctioned as a Division II league for 2017 and receiving full Division II sanctioning in 2018. Previously, the second North American Soccer League (NASL) had second-division status, sharing it with the USL in the 2017 season, but the NASL was denied second-division sanctioning for 2018 due to considerable instability in the league; the league effectively folded at that time.

There are two sanctioned Division III leagues, USL League One (USL1) and MLS Next Pro (MLSNP). USL1 was first announced on April 4, 2017, after USLC was officially sanctioned as a Division II league. On December 14, 2018, USSF officially granted USL1 Division III status for the 2019 season, starting with 10 teams. The first match was played March 29, 2019. On June 21, 2021, MLS announced the creation of MLS Next. Unlike USL1, MLS Next acts as a minor league system for MLS. Twenty-seven of the thirty MLS teams hold an affiliation with an MLS Next team. The first MLS Next match was held on March 24, 2022. The National Independent Soccer Association (NISA) began play in 2019 with an aim to join Division II, however it failed to be certified before going on hiatus 2025. NISA announced a partnership with RML Advisory Group to try and relaunch the league in the fall of 2026.

The only Division IV league in the United States is the USL League Two. For the 2026 season, there are a 158 teams split into 20 regional divisions split across four conferences. Though League Two does have some paid players, it also has many teams that are made up entirely or almost entirely of college soccer players who use the league as an opportunity to play competitive soccer in front of professional scouts during the summer, while retaining amateur status and NCAA eligibility. Other fourth-division leagues in the United States are the United Premier Soccer League, National Premier Soccer League and Ligas Unidas.

In addition to MLS and the USL, the United States Adult Soccer Association (USASA) governs amateur soccer competition for adults throughout the United States, which is effectively the amateur fifth division of soccer in the United States. The USASA sanctions regional tournaments that allow entry into the U.S. Open Cup, the oldest continuous national soccer competition in the United States. Since 1914, the competition has been open to all U.S. Soccer affiliated clubs, and currently pits teams from all five levels of the American soccer pyramid against each other each year, similarly to England's FA Cup.

=== Women ===
The National Women's Soccer League (NWSL) is the professional, top-division league in North America and as of 2024, is composed of 14 teams based in the U.S. Two professional, top-division leagues preceded the NWSL: the Women's United Soccer Association (WUSA), which featured many players from the 1999 FIFA Women's Cup-winning team (as well as other national teams), ran from 2001 to 2003 and Women's Professional Soccer (WPS) ran from 2009 to 2011.

Two second-division leagues currently exist: United Women's Soccer began play in May 2016 and as of 2020 features 30 teams in five conferences and the Women's Premier Soccer League (WPSL), started in 1997, features over 115 teams across the United States and Canada (the largest women's soccer league in the world as of 2020). Previously, the USL W-League was a semi-professional league that ran from 1995 to 2015 and featured a mix of college students and international players.

==== First division ====
===== National Women's Soccer League (NWSL), 2013–present =====
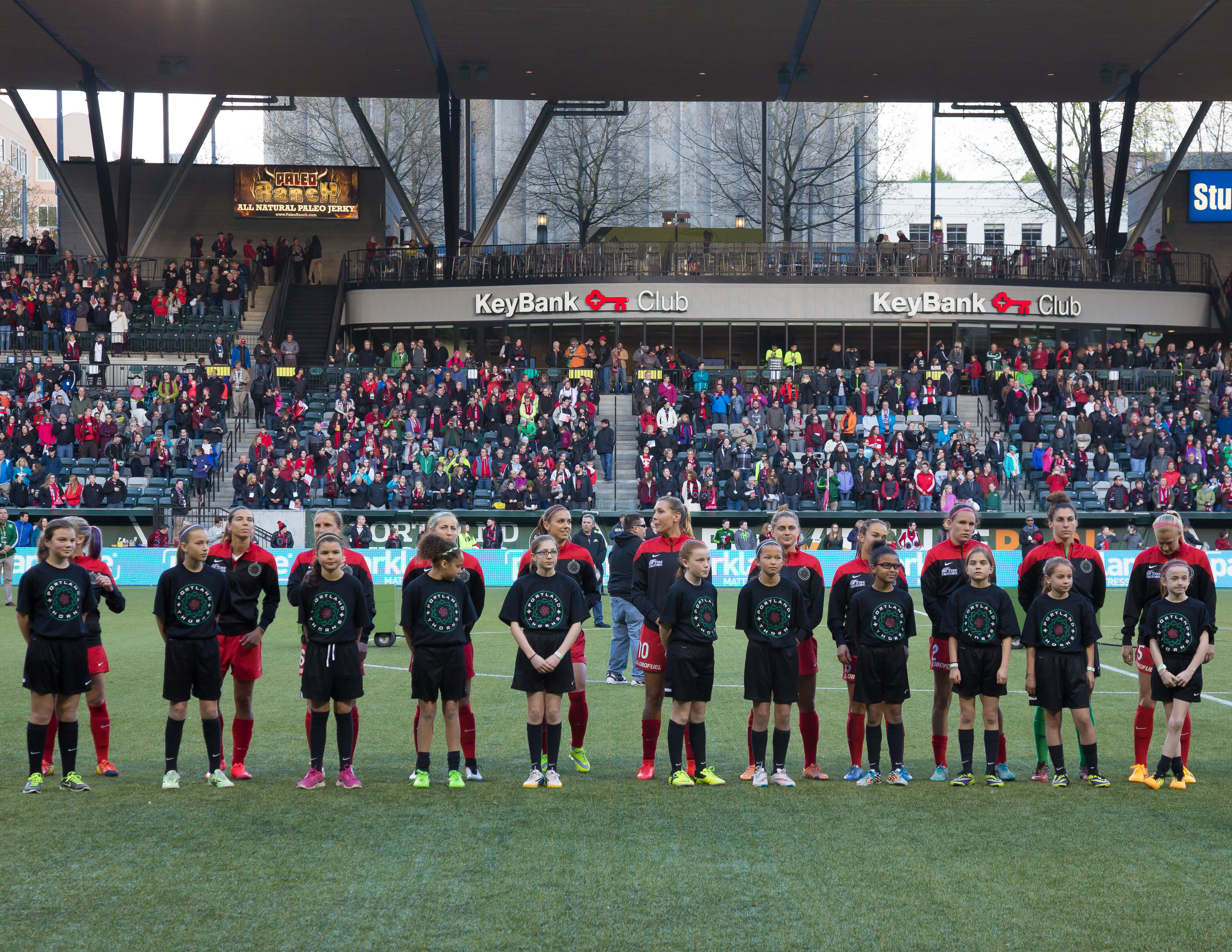
Portland Thorns players before a match, April 2015

On November 21, 2012, U.S. Soccer, in conjunction with the Canadian Soccer Association (CSA) and Mexican Football Federation (FMF), announced the formation of a new professional league for the 2013 season. The league, unnamed at the time of the initial announcement but later unveiled as the National Women's Soccer League (NWSL), launched in April 2013 with eight teams. Like WUSA and WPS, NWSL teams are privately owned, with some owned by existing MLS teams. The American and Canadian federations pay the salaries for many of their respective national team members. U.S. Soccer initially committed to funding up to 24 national team members, with the CSA committing to paying 16 players and FMF pledging support for at least 12 and possibly as many as 16. In addition, U.S. Soccer housed the league's front office for the first four years, and scheduled matches to avoid any possible conflict with international tournaments. Four of the league's charter teams had WPS ties—the Boston Breakers, Chicago Red Stars, Sky Blue FC, and the Western New York Flash. The other four initial teams were located in the Kansas City, Portland, Seattle, and Washington, D.C. markets with the Portland team run by the Portland Timbers of MLS. The NWSL expanded to nine teams for 2014 by adding the Houston Dash, run by the Houston Dynamo of MLS. In 2016, it expanded to 10 with the addition of another MLS-backed team, the Orlando Pride. Ahead of the 2017 season, A&E Networks announced it had taken an equity stake in the league and Lifetime would begin broadcasting games to a national television audience. As of 2017, additional expansion teams were being discussed by Los Angeles FC, Vancouver Whitecaps FC, and FC Barcelona, but none of these have yet materialized.

Several league changes occurred in advance of the 2017 season. First, FMF and U.S. Soccer amicably ended their partnership following FMF's establishment of its own women's professional league, Liga MX Femenil. The Western New York Flash ceased fully professional operations (though retaining its youth and, for a time, semi-pro operations), selling its NWSL franchise rights to Steve Malik, owner of then-NASL and current USLC side North Carolina FC. Malik relocated the NWSL team to NCFC's home of the Research Triangle and rebranded it as the North Carolina Courage. Both the Boston Breakers and FC Kansas City folded, with FCKC's player contracts transferred to Utah Royals FC, a new side owned and operated by Real Salt Lake.

The Seattle franchise went through two major changes in subsequent years. First, the team moved from Seattle to Tacoma and rebranded as Reign FC before the 2019 season. Then, in January 2020, the team was purchased by the parent company of French Ligue 1 power Olympique Lyonnais and rebranded again as OL Reign.

The league's next expansion was announced in November 2019, with a Louisville franchise granted to the ownership group of USLC side Louisville City FC, The Louisville side, which began play as Racing Louisville FC in 2021, is the first NWSL team whose entry into the league was announced more than 5 months before it started play.

===== Women's Professional Soccer (WPS), 2009–2011 =====
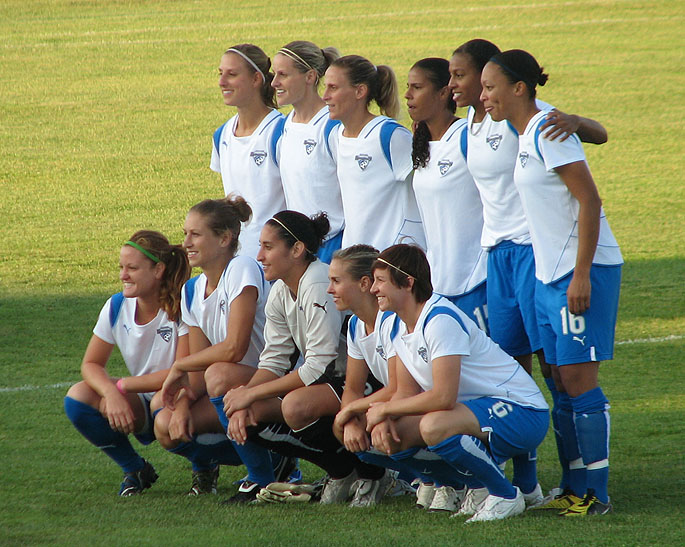
Boston Breakers squad featuring Kristine Lilly before a match, 2009

The second professional league, Women's Professional Soccer (WPS), was founded in 2009. The inaugural season champion was Sky Blue FC, based in the New York–New Jersey area. The team defeated the Los Angeles Sol 1–0 at The Home Depot Center in Carson, California. The WPS launched with seven teams, all based in the United States. The Sol folded after the league's inaugural season, and two new teams joined for 2010, bringing WPS to eight teams. However, the 2010 season saw considerable instability, with another charter team, Saint Louis Athletica, folding during the season, champions FC Gold Pride folding after the season, and the Chicago Red Stars deciding to regroup in the second-tier Women's Premier Soccer League (WPSL). The 2011 season, in which six teams based along the East Coast played, was marked by low attendance for most of the season and conflict with Dan Borislow, who had purchased the former Washington Freedom, moved the team to South Florida, and renamed it magicJack. The dispute between WPS and Borislow led the league to suspend the magicJack franchise, with Borislow responding by suing. The legal battle led WPS to suspend its 2012 season, with hopes of returning in 2013, but WPS soon decided to fold completely.

===== Women's United Soccer Association (WUSA), 2001–2003 =====
The Women's United Soccer Association (WUSA) was founded in 2001. Headlined by the stars of the 1999 FIFA Women's World Cup-winning team, $30 million was initially invested by numerous cable TV networks and owners. The league's inaugural match was held between the Washington Freedom featuring Mia Hamm and the Bay Area CyberRays (featuring Brandi Chastain) at RFK Stadium in Washington, D.C. In addition to the 34,148 fans in attendance being greater than any MLS game that weekend, the Turner Network Television (TNT) broadcast reached 393,087 households: more than two MLS games broadcast on ESPN and ESPN2. The league folded in 2003.

==== Second division ====
===== United Women's Soccer (UWS), 2016–present =====
United Women's Soccer (UWS) began play in May 2016, and as of 2020 features 30 teams in five conferences across the United States.

===== Women's Premier Soccer League (WPSL), 1997–present =====
Women's Premier Soccer League (WPSL), started in 1997, features over 115 teams across the United States and Canada (the largest women's soccer league in the world as of 2020).

===== USL W League, 1995–2015, 2022–present =====
The USL W-League was a semi-professional league that ran from 1995 to 2015 and featured a mix of college students and international players. A second pre-professional league named the USL W League began play in May 2022 with 44 teams organized into seven regional divisions.

USL also plans to launch a professional league, the USL Super League, in 2024 with an application for first-division sanctioning.

== Controversies ==
=== Concussions ===
In 2014, parents and former players filed a class action lawsuit against the United States Soccer Federation, FIFA, and other soccer organizations for failure to create policies that would prevent, evaluate, and manage concussion injuries. Soccer is second only to American football in the number of concussion injuries per year.

=== MLS relationship ===
The USSF has been accused by representatives of the North American Soccer League, among others, of unfairly protecting MLS's leading role in American professional soccer. Among their concerns is that the USSF benefits from financial dealings with MLS that it does not have with other leagues, giving it an apparent incentive to protect MLS from competition. This includes the contract that the USSF has with MLS's Soccer United Marketing (SUM) subsidiary in which most USSF sponsorship, television licensing and royalty revenues (outside of its apparel deal with Nike, Inc.) are paid through SUM. The USSF reported $15,433,754 in revenues through the SUM relationship in its 2014 audited financial report.

In 2015, the NASL took issue with proposed USSF rule changes reportedly making it harder to gain co-equal "Division 1" status with MLS that would increase the NASL's influence within the USSF as well as presumably allow more access to international competition and larger media and sponsorship contracts, calling the draft proposal "...an anti-competitive bait and switch, to entrench MLS's monopoly position at the very time when the NASL is threatening to become a significant competitor." Seats on the USSF's Professional Council governing committee are also based proportionally on pyramid level, giving MLS more votes when choosing the two professional league representatives on the USSF's board of directors. In 2015, those representatives were MLS Commissioner Don Garber and Alec Papadakis, CEO of the United Soccer League, who announced an affiliation with MLS in 2015.

=== International competitiveness ===
High-profile international soccer figures including former USMNT Head Coach Jürgen Klinsmann, former LA Galaxy head coach and USMNT Head Coach Bruce Arena and Manchester City coach and former FIFA World Coach of the Year Pep Guardiola, have expressed beliefs that the top-down structure of soccer developed and managed by the USSF in the United States, including pressure to have the best American players in MLS rather than higher-quality leagues in other countries, is hampering the nation's competitiveness in international soccer.

Conversely, Klinsmann has been criticized in turn by MLS representatives for recommending that American players leave MLS development systems to pursue professional careers in Europe in order to test themselves against higher levels of players in preparation for international competition. In 2015, MLS Commissioner Don Garber said, "I do believe our national team coach has a short-term objective. That's what he's hired to do. That doesn't mean next week, but it's to win the Gold Cup, it's to have the best possible team in 2018. And our goals and objectives are broader than that, and that's why we agree on some things but don't agree on others."

=== Women's national team lawsuit ===
On March 8, 2019, all members of the U.S. women's national team collectively filed a gender discrimination lawsuit against the U.S. Soccer Federation in a district court in Los Angeles. The lawsuit was filed due to claims that the athletes were being treated differently based on gender, affecting their paychecks, the facilities they were offered, and the medical treatment they received. Women on the team have previously filed complaints about pay disparity, including in 2016 when five members of the women's team filed a complaint with the Equal Employment Opportunity Commission.

On May 1, 2020, the district court dismissed the team's unequal and discriminatory pay claim, however, preserving the players' claims about unequal treatment in areas like travel, hotel accommodations, and team staffing. A trial on those issues is scheduled to begin June 16.

Judge R. Gary Klausner of the United States District Court for the Central District of California, granted the federation's motion for summary judgment. In his ruling, he dismissed the players' arguments that they were systematically underpaid by U.S. Soccer in comparison with the men's national team. According to Klausner, U.S. Soccer had substantiated its argument that the women's team had actually earned more "on both a cumulative and an average per-game basis" than the men's team during the years at issue in the lawsuit.

On February 22, 2022, the U.S. Soccer Federation agreed to settle the lawsuit for $24 million, with a proposed $22 million going to the players in the case and an additional $2 million to benefit USWNT players' post-career goals and also charitable efforts related to women's soccer. The settlement also requires both male and female soccer players to be paid equally for friendlies, and tournaments, including the World Cup.

U.S. Soccer became the first national governing body for the sport in the world to equalize World Cup prize money for its men's and women's teams. FIFA still distributes significantly more funds to its member associations for the men's event.

== Reports ==
=== Garcia Report ===
On July 17, 2012, in the wake of announced anti-corruption reforms by Sepp Blatter, the president of the world soccer governing body FIFA, the organization appointed U.S. lawyer Michael J. Garcia as the chairman of the investigative chamber of FIFA Ethics Committee, while German judge Hans-Joachim Eckert was appointed as the chairman of the Ethics Committee's adjudication chamber.

In August 2012, Garcia declared his intention to investigate the bidding process and decision to respectively award the right to host the 2018 and 2022 FIFA World Cup to Russia and Qatar by the FIFA Executive Committee. Garcia delivered his subsequent 350-page report in September 2014, and Eckert then announced that it would not be made public for legal reasons.

On November 13, 2014, Eckert released a 42-page summary of his findings after reviewing Garcia's report. The summary cleared both Russia and Qatar of any wrongdoing during the bidding for the 2018 and 2022 World Cups, leaving Russia and Qatar free to stage their respective World Cups.

FIFA welcomed "the fact that a degree of closure has been reached," while the Associated Press wrote that the Eckert summary "was denounced by critics as a whitewash." Hours after the Eckert summary was released, Garcia himself criticized it for being "materially incomplete" with "erroneous representations of the facts and conclusions," while declaring his intention to appeal to FIFA's Appeal Committee. On December 16, 2014, FIFA's Appeal Committee dismissed Garcia's appeal against the Eckert summary as "not admissible." FIFA also stated that Eckert's summary was "neither legally binding nor appealable." A day later, Garcia resigned from his role as FIFA ethics investigator in protest of FIFA's conduct, citing a "lack of leadership" and lost confidence in the independence of Eckert from FIFA.

In June 2015, Swiss authorities claimed the report was of "little value".

=== Yates Report ===
On October 3, 2022, the U.S. Soccer Federation publicly released the 173-page Yates Report, officially titled Report of the Independent Investigation to the U.S. Soccer Federation Concerning Allegations of Abusive Behavior and Sexual Misconduct in Women's Professional Soccer, the official report documenting the findings and conclusions concerning abusive behavior and sexual misconduct in women's professional soccer. The report is named for Sally Yates, the lawyer who led the investigation, a former Acting United States Attorney General.

== Leadership ==
=== Current board ===
As of March 8, 2024

Board of directors
Role	Member
President	Cindy Parlow Cone (former national team player and NWSL coach, USSF executive)
Chief executive officer	JT Batson
Vice president	Nathán Goldberg Crenier
Immediate past president (non-voting)	Carlos Cordeiro (former Goldman Sachs executive; abruptly resigned as USSF president March 2020)
Athlete representatives	Chris Ahrens (Paralympian national team player); Nelson Akwari (former MLS and USL player); Sean Boyle (Paralympian national team player); Lori Lindsey (former national team, WPS, and NWSL player; current NWSL, MLS, USL broadcast analyst); Danielle Slaton (former national team, WPS, and NWSL player); Whitney Engen (former national team and NWSL player); Cassidy Leake
Pro Council representatives	Jessica Berman (NWSL commissioner); Don Garber (MLS commissioner and CEO of Soccer United Marketing); Amanda Vandervort (president of USL Super League)
Adult Council representatives	Fritz Marth (vice president of United States Adult Soccer Association); John Motta (president of the United States Adult Soccer Association)
Youth Council representatives	Mike Cullina (CEO/executive director of US Club Soccer); Michael Karon (national president of American Youth Soccer Organization); Todd Lockhart; Pete Zopfi (trauma surgeon and chair of the board of United States Youth Soccer Association)
At-large representative	John Collins (sports law attorney)
Independent directors	Lisa Carnoy (banking executive); Patti Hart (former gaming executive and Yahoo board member); Juan Uro (former NBA executive)

=== Presidents ===
United States Soccer Football Association (until 1974)

- Gustav Randolph Manning (1913–1915)
- John A. Fernley (1915–1917)
- Peter Peel (1917–1919)
- George Healey (1919–1923)
- Peter Peel (1923–1924)
- Morris W. Johnson (1924–1926)
- Andrew Brown (1926–1928)
- Armstrong Patterson (1928–1932)
- Elmer A. Schroeder (1933–1934)
- Joseph J. Barriskill (1934–1936)
- Joseph Triner (1936–1938)
- H. S. Callowhill (1938–1941)
- Thomas E. Sager (1941–1945)
- H. H. Fairfield (1945–1948)
- Walter Giesler (1948–1950)
- F. W. Netto (1950–1952)
- James McGuire (1952–1954)
- E. Sullivan (1954–1957)
- W. Rechsteiner (1957–1959)
- Jack Flamhaft (1959–1961)
- J. Eugene Ringsdorf (1961–1963)
- George E. Fishwick (1963–1965)
- F. E. Woods (1965–1967)
- Bob Guelker (1967–1969)
- Erwin A. Single (1969–1971)
- James McGuire (1971–1974)

United States Soccer Federation (1974–present)

- Gene Edwards (1974–1984)
- Werner Fricker (1984–1990)
- Alan Rothenberg (1990–1998)
- Robert Contiguglia (1998 – March 11, 2006)
- Sunil Gulati (March 11, 2006 – January 10, 2018)
- Carlos Cordeiro (January 10, 2018 – March 12, 2020)
- Cindy Parlow Cone (March 12, 2020 – present)

== Current sponsorships ==
- Allstate
- American Airlines
- Anheuser-Busch
- AT&T
- Bank of America
- Chobani
- Coca-Cola
- CVS
- Deloitte
- Ferrara
- Haleon
- Henkel
- Home Depot
- Jim Beam
- Kellanova
- Marriott
- New York Life
- Nike
- Purina
- Ticketmaster
- Truly Hard Seltzer
- Visa
- Volkswagen

== Previous sponsorships ==
- Avaya
- BioSteel
- Bud Light
- Castrol
- Century 21
- Chase Bank
- Chevrolet
- Chipotle
- Chips Ahoy!
- Chiquita
- Clorox
- Continental AG
- Coppertone
- Cutter
- Degree
- DePuy Synthes
- Dick's Sporting Goods
- Dodge
- DoubleTree
- El Jimador Tequila
- Gatorade
- GoGo SqueeZ
- Havoline
- Hershey's
- Hisense
- Hyundai
- Johnson & Johnson
- Jose Cuervo
- Kumho Tire
- Kwik Goal
- Lego
- Liberty Mutual
- McDonald's
- Oreo
- Panasonic
- Panini
- Pepsi
- Pepsi Max
- Philips
- Powerade
- Ritz
- Secret
- Shell USA
- Sierra Mist
- TAG Heuer
- Texaco Xpress Lube
- Thorne Protein
- Trident
- Upper Deck
- Volpi Foods
- Yingli

== See also ==
- American Football Association
- U.S. Soccer Athlete of the Year
- USWNT All-Time Best XI
- National Soccer Hall of Fame
- U.S. Soccer Development Academy
- USSF State Soccer Associations
- Futsal in the United States
- United States men's national beach soccer team
- United States women's national beach soccer team
- United States Futsal Federation
