= Terry Cooke =

English footballer

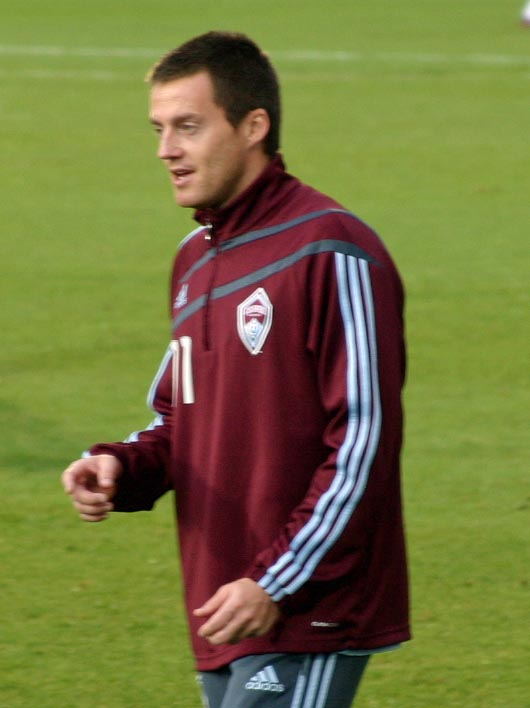
- Cooke with Colorado Rapids in 2009

Personal information
- Full name: Terence John Cooke
- Date of birth: 5 August 1976 (age 50)
- Place of birth: Marston Green, Solihull, England
- Height: 5 ft 7 in (1.70 m)
- Position: Midfielder

Team information
- Current team: Denver Kickers (director of coaching)

Youth career
- 1994–1995: Manchester United

Senior career*
Years	Team	Apps	(Gls)
1994–1999	Manchester United	4	(0)
1996	→ Sunderland (loan)	6	(0)
1996	→ Birmingham City (loan)	3	(0)
1998–1999	→ Wrexham (loan)	10	(0)
1999	→ Manchester City (loan)	17	(5)
1999–2002	Manchester City	20	(2)
2000	→ Wigan Athletic (loan)	10	(1)
2000	→ Sheffield Wednesday (loan)	13	(1)
2000–2001	→ Sheffield Wednesday (loan)	4	(0)
2002	→ Grimsby Town (loan)	3	(1)
2002–2003	Grimsby Town	25	(0)
2003–2004	Sheffield Wednesday	23	(2)
2005–2009	Colorado Rapids	106	(4)
2009–2010	North Queensland Fury	10	(1)
2010–2011	Gabala	12	(1)
Total		266	(18)

International career
1996	England U21	4	(0)
- * Club domestic league appearances and goals

Terence John Cooke (born 5 August 1976) is an English professional football coach and former player who is director of coaching of Colorado Soccer Association club Denver Kickers.

As a player he was a midfielder from 1994 to 2011. Born in Marston Green, he began his career with Manchester United, but struggled to break into the first team and had loan spells with Sunderland, Birmingham City and Wrexham before moving to United's local rivals Manchester City in 1999. He also failed to make an impact at City and again went on loan to Wigan Athletic, Sheffield Wednesday and Grimsby Town. The loan to Grimsby became permanent in 2002, but he only remained there for a year before rejoining Sheffield Wednesday for a season.

In 2005, Cooke's career took him out of England for the first time as he joined Major League Soccer's Colorado Rapids. In four years with the team, he made more than 100 appearances, but he was deemed to be surplus to requirements at the end of the 2009 MLS season and released from his contract. As a free agent, he was picked up by Australian side North Queensland Fury, and in the 2010–11 season he played for Gabala of Azerbaijan. Cooke also made four appearances for the England under-21s.

== Club career ==
=== Manchester United ===
Cooke grew up as a Birmingham City supporter, and came up through the youth system of Manchester United and scored the penalty that clinched the FA Youth Cup in 1995, but only appeared in eight first team matches with the club. He made his debut in a Premier League match against Bolton Wanderers in September 1995, and provided the cross for a Ryan Giggs goal, and found himself being tipped for a bright future. He then scored in the second leg of United's League Cup aggregate defeat to York City at Bootham Crescent in early October. However, he only played six more games for the club, his first team opportunities severely limited by the excellence of fellow youngster David Beckham in Cooke's favoured position on the right-hand side of midfield.

During his time with Manchester United, he was loaned out to Sunderland, Birmingham City, Wrexham and Manchester City.

=== Manchester City ===
Following his loan spell at Maine Road, Manchester City subsequently bought him for £600,000, potentially rising to £1 million in April 1999. Cooke was part of the City side that earned promotion from Division Two in the 1998–99 season, but lost his place in the team the following season, when City won a second successive promotion to reach the Premier League. While at City, he was loaned out to Wigan Athletic, Sheffield Wednesday (where he scored once against QPR) and Grimsby Town.

=== Grimsby Town ===
Grimsby manager Paul Groves managed to make Cooke's switch to Blundell Park a permanent one, following his release from Manchester City at the end of the 2001–2002 season. While on loan, Cooke scored once, against Norwich in three appearances and did enough to earn himself a full-time position at the club. Cooke was a reasonable success with The Mariners, though his time with the club was overshadowed by an eventual off-field feud with his manager. Also the signing of former Grimsby hero John Oster from Sunderland on loan had caused Cooke to lose his place in the team, as Oster successfully made the spot on the right wing his, despite the fact Cooke's overall performances beforehand made him one of the more impressive players in a struggling team. After making his move permanent he scored once, his strike coming against Burnley in the FA Cup. Cooke often found himself left out on the substitutes' bench, or not included in the 16-man selection at all, this despite vocal protests from supporters during the games. Grimsby were eventually relegated from the First Division, and at the end of the 2002–03 season, Cooke was amongst the number of players who left the club.

=== Sheffield Wednesday ===
It was Grimsby's relegation rivals Sheffield Wednesday who would benefit from Cooke's departure from Blundell Park. He signed a one-year deal with the club. After playing out the 2003–04 campaign, at the end of which the Owls avoided relegation, Cooke departed the club and emigrated to the United States.

=== Colorado Rapids ===
In 2005, Cooke signed with Colorado Rapids, and scored two goals and had two assists during his first MLS season. On 1 April 2008, the Rapids beat David Beckham's Los Angeles Galaxy 4–0. Cooke captained the team in what was their first game of the season, scored a goal and provided two assists, and was voted MLS Player of the Week.

Cooke was waived by Colorado at the end of July 2009 to make room for the signing of Jamie Smith from Aberdeen. Remaining in the US, he was invited to trial with Seattle Sounders FC that August.

Cooke trained with Nottingham Forest to regain his fitness, and played in a reserve match against Coventry City, but manager Billy Davies did not offer him a contract.

=== North Queensland Fury ===
Cooke arrived in Townsville to trial with A-League franchise North Queensland Fury as a possible replacement for injured fellow Englishman James Robinson. He was signed by Ian Ferguson on 25 November and made his debut against Adelaide United on 28 November. He scored his first goal for the Fury on 13 February against Gold Coast United, scoring the game-winner in the 83rd minute of a 2–1 victory. After his short-term deal expired Cooke left the Fury as the club fell into administration.

=== Gabala ===
Cooke then joined Gabala of Azerbaijan, managed by Tony Adams. After making 12 appearances in which he scored one goal, Cooke then suffered a serious knee injury which kept him out for the remainder of the season, at the end of which he was released by the club.

== International career ==
Cooke represented England at U16, U18 and U21 levels, but was never capped by the full senior side.

== Coaching career ==
Cooke is now employed as the director of coaching for the Denver Kickers.

== Honours ==
Manchester United Youth

- FA Youth Cup: 1994–95

Manchester City

- Football League Second Division play-offs: 1999

Individual

- Jimmy Murphy Young Player of the Year: 1994–95
