= Gerard Jones (football coach) =

English professional football coach

Personal information
- Full name: Gerard Jones
- Date of birth: 24 June 1989 (age 37)
- Place of birth: York, England

Youth career
- Years: Team
- Halifax Town

Managerial career
- 2014–2015: Eccleshill United
- 2025: Visakha
- 2026: Bangladesh U17
- 2026: Bangladesh U20

Gerard Jones (born 24 June 1989) is an English entrepreneur, football manager and former player who was most recently head coach of the Bangladesh national under-20 and under-17 teams.

A former youth player at Halifax Town, Jones set up a football coaching business in early 2009, which he later grew into becoming recognized among the Top 100 Best Business Start-ups in the UK in 2010 by Startups.co.uk.

Jones has over 18 years experience coaching in the U.K., U.S., Italy, Norway, Morocco and New Zealand. He has previously worked as an elite coach educator with the Royal Moroccan Football Federation, director of coaching at Sporting Kansas City, head of academy coaching at Bristol Rovers, under-21s assistant coach at Bradford City, an academy coach at Rochdale and manager at Eccleshill United.

== Coaching career ==
Since leaving Bristol Rovers in 2018, Jones joined United States Soccer Federation as a nationally licensed Coach Educator, having been identified by USSF to deliver nationally accredited coach education courses through Eastern New York State Soccer Association and other state associations. As a published author in communication psychology through the use of Game-calls with a focus on the use of feedback, Jones has presented at several coaching conferences and events, which includes as a Guest Presenter at the Kentucky Youth Soccer Association "Soccer Learning University" conference in 2020, one of the United States Soccer Federation State Soccer Association sharing insight into his 4-Cs Coaching Approach which guides his coaching philosophy.

Jones joined the Royal Moroccan Football Federation recruited by Osian Roberts as an Elite Coach Educator (Formateur des Entraîneurs) in Feb 2020.

He became a Director of Coaching at Major League Soccer Sporting Kansas City. in 2022.

In the summer of 2025, he left Sporting KC to become the Head Coach of Visakha in the Cambodian Premier League.

He currently serves as Head of Youth & Development Coach for the BFF, overseeing the men's national youth pathway from under-14 to under-23 level. He also serves as Head Coach of the Bangladesh under-17 and under-20 national teams.

Appointed in June 2026 following a competitive international recruitment process involving 115 applicants. Jones was ranked first following interviews with five finalists and selected ahead of a candidate pool that included several high profiles including AFC Pro Licence holders and former international players.

=== Early career ===
Jones started his coaching career in schools and community programs, later going on to launch his own coaching business Gerard School of Football. He then coached at various non-league youth and reserve teams, alongside college and university programs, and later became an Academy Coach at Rochdale A.F.C and First Team Manager at Eccleshill United F.C.

In 2011, Jones was listed among the Top 50 brightest and most talented people in the North of England, and in 2014 was also awarded the Junior Chamber International U.K. Ten Outstanding Young Persons (TOYP) award for his entrepreneurial success and creation of coaching programs with Gerard School of Football.

In March 2016, Jones left England and his role with Bradford City A.F.C. where he was the Assistant U21s Coach through American collegiate soccer academy RIASA, to become the Director of Coaching at Eastside F.C. in Michigan.

Alongside coaching, Jones is also a published author with his book titled: Let's Talk Soccer.

=== Bristol Rovers ===
June 2017, Bristol Rovers F.C. announced Jones as Head of Academy Coaching, responsible for the development of the Academy coaching program and coach development across all ages, working with the Academy Manager and Phase Lead Coaches to enhance the efficiency of their programs.

=== Morocco, Sporting Kansas City and Visakha FC ===
In early 2020, Jones joined the Royal Moroccan Football Federation as an Elite Coach Educator under the direction of then National Technical Director Osian Roberts.

He later joined MLS Sporting Kansas City in early 2022 as a Director of Coaching.

In the summer of 2025, he left Sporting Kansas City to become the Head Coach of Visakha FC in the Cambodian Premier League on a two-year contract. After winning the Pre-Season Cup, Jones led the team to two wins and three draws from their opening seven league matches, leaving Visakha seventh in the table before the club decided to part ways with him as Head Coach on 10 October 2025 following a 2-2 draw away to Nagaworld FC.

=== 2026 and Bangladesh Football Federation ===
During the summer of 2026, Jones was mentioned by local media as a potential candidate for the vacant FC Halifax Town managerial position following the departure of Adam Lakeland to Morecambe F.C.. Other names linked with the role included Kevin Nolan, Kevin Phillips, Neal Ardley and Jon Stead.

In June 2026, Jones was appointed Head of Youth & Development Coach of the Bangladesh Football Federation (BFF) on a two year contract, with responsibility for leading the development of men's youth national teams from under-14 to under-23 level. His immediate priority was preparing the Bangladesh under-20 national team for the 2027 AFC U-20 Asian Cup qualification tournament in Uzbekistan.

Following the appointment, BFF Development Committee member Sameed Quasem described Jones' arrival as "a huge credit to our entire football structure," adding that Jones would also conduct nationwide talent scouting, work closely with local coaches, and contribute to the Bangladesh Football Federation's coaching education programme. Quasem said Jones' appointment formed part of the federation's long-term strategy to strengthen youth development and player pathways.

During Jones' tenure, Bangladesh was confirmed as a participant in the inaugural FIFA U-15 World Cup and Festival, to be held in Azerbaijan in October 2026 following FIFA's expansion of global youth competitions. The competition was approved by the FIFA Council last December as part of FIFA's commitment to developing youth football worldwide.

== Coaching qualifications ==
Jones holds the FA UEFA A Licence and FA Advanced Youth Award (12–16) alongside a master's degree in Performance Coaching from the University of Stirling. He is currently undertaking a PhD in Skill Acquisition at Sheffield Hallam University where his research explores how coaches can use verbal augmented information to guide athlete perception, decision-making, and learning within sport. Alongside his doctoral studies, he has presented his research at academic conferences, including Newcastle University's Psychological Insights into Coaching Practice Conference, and continues to contribute to coach education through teaching, research, and applied practice. Additionally, he created a digital tech-startup providing online coach education for coaches, which has already received support from NatWest via their Entrepreneur Accelerator programme and the University of Cambridge's Impulse Programme for High Tech Innovation. He also possesses a PGCE in Lifelong Learning from the University of Huddersfield, and has also completed a second Masters degree in Sports Directorship at Manchester Metropolitan University alongside other notable alumni including Steve Round, Karen Bardsley, and Nick Cox.

Jones is also a Nationally Licensed Coach Educator for United States Soccer Federation and has also mentored coaches on behalf of The Football Association of Wales, Asian Football Confederation, the Football Association and other governing bodies

== Honours ==
Visakha FC

- VSK Cup 2025
