= Gene Edwards (soccer executive) =

American soccer executive (1917–2000)

President of the United States Soccer Federation
- In office March 11, 1974 – February 10, 1984
- Preceded by: James McGuire
- Succeeded by: Werner Fricker

Vice President of United States Soccer Federation

Personal details
- Born: September 16, 1917 Milwaukee, Wisconsin, U.S.
- Died: March 28, 2000 (aged 82) Milwaukee, Wisconsin, U.S.

Gene Edwards (September 16, 1917 – March 28, 2000) was an American sports administrator who was the president of the United States Soccer Federation, and was a member of the U.S. Soccer Hall of Fame and the CONCACAF Hall of Fame.

== Life and career ==
Edwards was born in Milwaukee, Wisconsin on September 16, 1917. He served as a vice president of U.S. Soccer from 1968. Edwards was president of the United States Soccer Federation from 1974 to 1984. Edwards also served as a member of the FIFA Amateur Committee, the CONCACAF Executive Committee, and the Executive Committee of the United States Olympic Committee. Edwards was coach of the United States teams at the 1971 and 1975 Pan-American Games and the 1972 Olympic Games. Edwards was inducted into the U.S. Soccer Hall of Fame in 1985. He died in Milwaukee on March 28, 2000, at the age of 82.
