= CSSA =

CSSA may refer to:

== Organizations ==
- Cactus and Succulent Society of America
- California State Student Association
- Center for Service & Social Action, furthering the Jesuit mission of educating through service and advocacy
- Chinese Students and Scholars Association, the official organization for overseas Chinese students
- Connecticut State Soccer Association
- Corporación Sudamericana de Servicios Aéreos, an airline merged into Aviación del Litoral Fluvial Argentino
- Crop Science Society of America

== Other uses ==
- Star of South Africa, Commander (post-nominal letters)
- Comprehensive Social Security Assistance, a welfare programme operated by Social Welfare Department of Hong Kong
- Camp Stanley Storage Activity, operated by Camp Stanley, US

== See also ==
- CSSA Nations Cup, a former football championship
