= USFF =

USFF may refer to

- Ultra small form factor
- United States Fleet Forces Command
- United States Futsal Federation
- United States First Fleet
