= MLF =

MLF may refer to:

== Organizations ==
- Macina Liberation Front, a militant Islamist group that operates in Mali
- Major League Fishing, a professional bass fishing league and television show
- Major League Futsal, a futsal league in the United States
- Mission laïque française, a non-profit organization
- Mouvement de libération des femmes, a French feminist movement
- Mutant Liberation Front, a supervillain group from Marvel Comics

== Other ==
- Malolactic fermentation, a process in winemaking in which tart-tasting malic acid is converted to softer-tasting lactic acid
- Medial longitudinal fasciculus, one of a pair of crossed over tracts, on each side of the brainstem
- Micro-leadframe, a type of connection between integrated circuits and printed circuit boards
- Multilateral Force, an American proposal for a fleet of submarines and warships, crewed by NATO personnel, and armed with nuclear missiles
- Machine learning fairness, various attempts at correcting algorithmic bias in machine learning models
