= United States Futsal Federation =

American futsal league

CONCACAF
- Website: United States Futsal Federation

The United States Futsal Federation (USFF) is one of the futsal-governing body in the United States, a member of the United States Soccer Federation.

The USFF was formed in 1981. It was founded to promote the sport of futsal in the United States and to ensure that sport standards were followed. According to the USFS's website, there are 110,000 members of the federation.

In 1986, the Boys & Girls Clubs of America adopted futsal, under USFF government, as an "Olympic Focus Sport", and began introducing it to the various clubs throughout the country. In that same, year, the American Youth Soccer Association became an associate member of the federation.

The USFF also works to introduce the sport to various YMCA chapters, the National High School Association of America, the NCAA and the National Junior College Association.

The federation sponsors sports clinics, national championships, and American teams in international competitions. The federation is made up of individual state associations, which are responsible for promoting futsal at the local level.

The current coach of the United States national futsal team is Serbian Dušan Jakica.

== United States National Futsal Championship ==
The first National Futsal Championship was held in Reno, Nevada in the mid-1980s. Since that time, several different levels of competition have been organized to hold annual championships. Championships are held in the Men's, Women's, Under-19 Boys and Girls, the Under-16 Boys and Girls, and the Under-12 Boys and Girls Divisions. Originally, 8 teams per division were allowed to compete in each championship, but since 2004, 16 teams have participated in each competition.

== See also ==
- Futsal in the United States
