= Professional Futsal League =

Planned futsal league

- Founded: 2016
- Country: United States
- Confederation: CONCACAF
- Website: Official website

The Professional Futsal League was a planned professional futsal league in the United States. The league was founded in 2016 and it was intended to begin play in 2018.

== History ==
In February 2016, Mark Cuban purchased a principal ownership stake in the PFL. In an attempt to build support for the league, the PFL announced an All-star game to be played on August 4, 2016 in Orlando. On August 17, 2019, the PFL International Challenge was held at Allen Event Center in Allen, Texas, featuring the FC Barcelona Futsal under-23 team, Dallas Sidekicks, Team USA and Team Australia.

== See also ==
- Futsal in the United States
- Major League Futsal
