= Monterey Peninsula Soccer League =

- Founded: 1984
- Country: United States
- Confederation: United States Soccer Federation
- Number of clubs: 8
- Current champions: Dirty Ducks (Spring 2010)
- Most championships: PG United (10 titles)
- Website: http://www.montereysoccer.org

The Monterey Peninsula Soccer League is an adult amateur soccer league featuring teams from Monterey, California and the surrounding areas. The league is an affiliate of the United States Soccer Federation.

== History ==
The Monterey Peninsula Soccer League (MPSL) is a USSF affiliated adult amateur league that was founded in the early 1980s. Historically, teams from the Monterey Institute of International Studies, the Naval Postgraduate School, Monterey Peninsula College, the Presidio of Monterey and CSU Monterey Bay, along with a number of other local teams have participated in this league.

== Organization ==
The MPSL is affiliated with FIFA through the U.S. Soccer Federation, the United States Adult Soccer Association and the California Soccer Association North (CSAN). All players must be registered for the MPSL through CSAN. The level of play varies between Division 1 and Division 2 from year-to-year because of the annual turnover caused by the large number of graduate and undergraduate students that play in the MPSL. Games are officiated under the FIFA Laws of the Game using a center referee and two assistant referees. Unlimited substitutions are allowed with the center referee's permission on dead balls.

== Teams in the MPSL ==
=== Active as of 2014 ===
- Central Coast FC
- Monterey Ducks
- MIIS
- NPS Varsity

== Former Teams ==
- Monterey United
- Pacific Grove United "Orcas"
- PG United
- Internacional
- Atlético Español
- Forces United
- MSSC
- African Lions

== Champions ==
=== Year by year ===
Year	Winner	Runner up	Third place
Spring 2003	Monterey United	NPS Varsity	Brittania Arms FC
Fall 2003	Monterey United	Monterey City	NPS Varsity
Spring 2004	MIIS	Monterey City	Monterey United
Spring 2005	MIIS	PG United	Monterey United
Summer 2005	PG United	NPS Varsity	Monterey United
Fall 2005	MIIS	PG United	Monterey United
Spring 2006	Internacional	Brittania Arms FC	Monterey United
Summer 2006	Brittania Arms FC	Dirty Ducks (as Materrazzi's Chest)	Ramirez Plumbing
Fall 2006	Dirty Ducks (as Materrazzi's Chest)	Monterey United	Brittania Arms FC
Spring 2007	Dirty Ducks	Brittania Arms FC	Monterey United
Summer 2007	PG United	Dirty Ducks	MIIS
Fall 2007	PG United	MIIS	Dirty Ducks
Spring 2008	PG United	Dirty Ducks	NPS Varsity
Fall 2008	PG United	NPS Varsity	Brittania Arms FC
Spring 2009	Dirty Ducks	Wolf Pack	PG United
Fall 2009	PG United	Dirty Ducks	Atletico Español
Spring 2010	Dirty Ducks	Atletico Español	PG United
