= Denver Kickers =

American soccer club

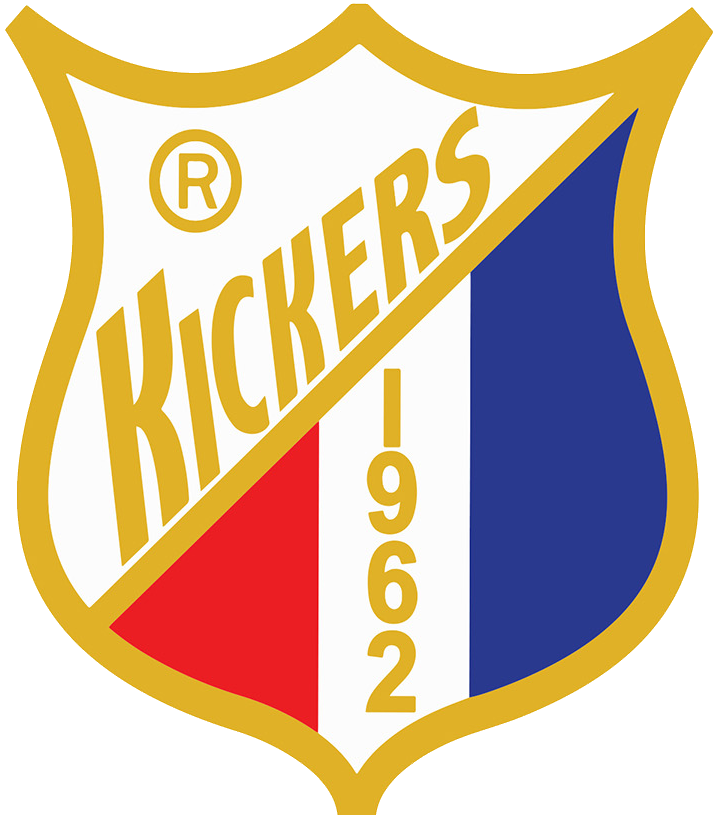
- Full name: Denver Kickers Sports Club
- Nickname: Kickers
- Founded: 1962; 64 years ago
- Ground: Denver Kickers Sport Complex, Golden, Colorado
- League: Colorado Soccer Association
- 2025: ?
- Website: denverkickers.com
Home colours

Denver Kickers Sport Club Inc. are an American soccer club, founded in 1956. The club fields a number of teams at the adult and youth levels. The Kickers premier team plays in the USASA sanctioned Colorado Soccer Association. The club is a former member of the National Premier Soccer League (NPSL), the fourth tier of the American Soccer Pyramid, and played in the Southwest Conference.

They currently play their home games at the Denver Kickers Sport Complex in Golden, Colorado, 15 miles west of downtown Denver. The team's colors are red, white and blue. When the Kickers won the National Amateur Cup in 1977, 1978, and 1983, their colors were white jerseys, black shorts, and white stockings. The Kickers repeated as National Amateur champions in 1994 and 1995.

The Kickers are part of a larger organization which celebrates the German heritage of the Denver area through sports – mainly soccer and dancing. In addition to the NPSL side, the Kickers organization has over 400 members and sponsors four Men's Adult Soccer teams, one Women's Adult Soccer team, Competitive Youth Soccer teams, and Recreation Youth Soccer teams, as well as Adult and Junior Schuhplattlers (Bavarian Dance Groups).

== Establishment date ==
Current management of the Kickers says the club was founded in 1962 and today's team patches carry this date, but there are club banners and patches with the date 1956. According to long-time member and former chairman John Ziel, the Denver Kickers as a soccer team began in 1956, and the Kickers organization was incorporated in 1962.

== Year-by-year ==
Year	Division	League	Reg. season	Playoffs	Open Cup
2006	"4"	NPSL	4th, Southwest	Did not qualify	Did not qualify
2007	"4"	NPSL	6th, Southwest	Did not qualify	Did not qualify
