= Utah Youth Soccer Association =

- Full name: Utah Youth Soccer Association Inc.
- Founded: January 7, 1978
- President: Brian J. Smith
- CEO: Andrew R Hiatt
- Website: http://www.uysa.org/

Utah Youth Soccer Association (UYSA) is the Utah soccer organization that represents the United States Youth Soccer Association. UYSA is part of Region IV (of four regions) of US Youth Soccer. Utah Youth Soccer Association provides soccer for youth across the state of Utah for all levels of play. UYSA organizes youth soccer events and tournaments for teams throughout each seasonal year.

== Criticisms ==
Utah Youth Soccer Association uses a secure online database to register all of their members but has been criticized by parents and the Utah Attorney General's Office for collecting sensitive information by scanning children's birth certificates creating the possibility of identity theft.

== Gaming League ==
Season	Teams Registered	Goals Scored
Fall 2014 Gaming League	1,343	
Spring 2014 Gaming League	1,213	22,155

== Tournaments ==
RSL State Cup is a first-stage National Championship Series tournament. The national Championship Series is provided by US Youth Soccer as an opportunity for teams to advance to the US Youth Soccer national Championship. RSL State Cup determines Utah State Champions from each age group of each gender U11-U19. The RSL State Cup is played in the fall and spring. The Champions of RSL state cup advance to the US Youth Soccer Region IV Championships (second-stage).

=== President's Day Cup ===
Utah Youth Soccer holds President's Cup annually on separate weekends in January and February in Mesquite Nevada. The champions of President's Cup in Utah move on to Regional and National President's Cup. President's Cup is an opportunity for more Utah teams to play on a Regional and National level with US Youth Soccer. Teams are not allowed to play in State Cup and President's Cup in the same year.

== Kirk Hoecherl Hall of Fame ==
The Kirk Hoecherl Award is given out every year to an individual who has distinguished themselves by volunteering for Utah Youth Soccer.

== See also ==
- Ogden City SC
- Utah Soccer Association
