= Futsal in the United States =

Futsal in the U.S.

- Country: United States
- Governing body: U.S. Soccer
- National teams: Men's national team Women's national team

National competitions
- Major League Futsal; Professional Futsal League; American Futsal League (AMF); National Futsal Premier League (active)

International competitions
- FIFA Futsal World Cup; CONCACAF Futsal Championship; CONCACAF Futsal Club Championship; AMF Futsal World Cup

Futsal in the United States is a growing phenomenon. As of 2026 only the National Futsal Premier League as professional futsal league in the United States. A number of regions have their own leagues.

Futsal Across America has created developmental Futsal programs for schools, clubs and communities. The national team has placed runner-up in 1992 and third place in 1989 at the FIFA Futsal World Cup.

== See also ==
- Major Arena Soccer League
