= North Coast Soccer League =

- Founded: 1982
- Country: United States
- Confederation: CONCACAF; US Soccer
- Divisions: 1
- Number of clubs: 13
- Promotion to: None
- Relegation to: None
- Domestic cup: Lamar Hunt U.S. Open Cup
- Current champions: Concordia (2011)
- Most championships: Donauschwaben (5 titles) & Concordia (5 titles)
- Website: Official site
- Current: 2012 NCSL season

The North Coast Soccer League (NCSL) is a soccer league in northern Ohio recognized by the Ohio Soccer Association North (OSA-N), the United States Adult Soccer Association (USASA). The league is affiliated to the United States Adult Soccer Association and teams qualify for the U.S. Open Cup through USASA channels. The league is generally considered to be at the fifth tier of competition in the United States soccer pyramid.

== History ==
The North Coast Soccer League was founded in 1982 in Northern Ohio.

== Records ==
=== Past Cup Champions ===
Year	Champion	Score	Runner-up
1982	no records		
1983	Edelweiss Ski Club		
1984	Luchitas		Britches
1985	Middleburg Inter		Concordia
1986	Luchitas		Middleburg Inter
1987	Middleburg Inter		Luchitas
1988	Pan-Americans		Concordia
1989	Klein Auto		Concordia
1990	Around the Corner		Italia
1991	Concordia		Around the Corner
1992	Italia		Pan-Americans
1993	Samba Boys		Concordia
1994	Samba Boys		Pan-Americans
1995	Samba Boys		Ciac Juve
1996	Shamrocks		Pan-Americans
1997	Ciac Juve		Pan-Americans
1998	Manchester United		Shamrocks
1999	Shamrocks		Pan-Americans
2000	Donauschwaben		Athens FC
2001	Shamrocks		Donauschwaben
2002	United FC		Donauschwaben
2003	Donauschwaben		Athens FC
2004	Cleveland West		Shamrocks
2005	Donauschwaben		Juve
2006	Donauschwaben		United FC
2007	Cleveland Croatia		Shamrocks
2008	Donauschwaben		Cleveland FC
2009	Concordia		Manchester United
2010	Concordia		Donauschwaben
2011	Concordia	4 - 2	Donauschwaben

=== Total Cup Championships ===
#	Team	Years
5	Donauschwaben	2000, 2003, 2005, 2006, 2008
5	Concordia	1983, 1991, 2009, 2010, 2011
3	Shamrocks	1996, 1999, 2001
3	Samba Boys	1993, 1994, 1995
2	Luchitas	1984, 1986
2	Middleburg Inter	1985, 1987
1	Around the Corner	1990
1	Ciac Juve	1997
1	Cleveland Croatia SC	2007
1	Cleveland West	2004
1	Italia	1992
1	Klein Auto	1989
1	Manchester United	1998
1	Pan-Americans	1988
1	United FC	2002

=== Total Cup Championship Appearances ===
#	Team	Years
9	Concordia	1983, 1985, 1988, 1989, 1991, 1993, 2009, 2010, 2011
9	Donauschwaben	2000, 2001, 2002, 2003, 2005, 2006, 2008, 2010, 2011
6	Pan-Americans	1998, 1992, 1994, 1996, 1997, 1999
6	Shamrocks	1996, 1998, 1999, 2001, 2004, 2007
3	Ciac Juve	1995, 1997, 2005
3	Luchitas	1984, 1986, 1987
3	Middleburg Inter	1985, 1986, 1987
3	Samba Boys	1993, 1994, 1995
2	Around the Corner	1990, 1991
2	Athens FC	2000, 2003
2	Italia	1990, 1992
2	Manchester United	1998, 2009
2	United FC	2002, 2006
1	Britches	1984
1	Cleveland Croatia SC	2007
1	Cleveland SC	2008
1	Cleveland West	2004
1	Klein Auto	1989

== 2012 Season Awards ==
"Goal"den Boot Award - Ivan Pandza (9 goals)

Goalkeeper of the Year Award - Eric Sebor (1.167 GAA)

Team Fair Play Award - United FC (4 points)

== 2012 Teams ==
As of October 16, 2012

- Cleveland Kickers
- Concordia
- Donauschwaben
- Frontline FC
- Manchester United
- Partizan Ohio FC
- Revelations SC
- Sixth City FC
- UASC Ternopil
- United FC
- Western Reserve FC
- Westside FC
- Woodridge PFC
