= Men's Island Soccer Organization =

The Major Island Soccer Organization is an amateur soccer league located in Oahu, Hawaii. Within this soccer league there are three divisions, Division I, Division II, and Division III. In the past, there were two different seasons in a year. The spring season would start in the middle of January and end in the first week of July. The fall season would begin in August and end in December. Since 2006, the season lasts approximately a year. Between the leagues there is the Robledo Cup tournament. At the end of every season, the winning team from Division II is promoted to Division I. The same happens with the winner of Division III. The teams in Division I and II with the fewest points at the end of the season are relegated.

== All-time teams ==
- Aloha Amazon
- Honolulu Bulls
- Bulls Junior
- Kapaolono Dawgs
- International Honolulu
- Kamikaze
- Lanikai Tuesday FC
- Rush Latin HFC
- Waipio FC
- Koa United
- Hawaii Rush
- Lanikai Thursday
- Slammers Real HFC
- Boca Honolulu
- Kahekili
- Kap Park
- Ronins
- Faded Premier
- Phoenix Holokahi
- Vaiete SC
- Stoked FC
- Galaxy FC
- Boca West
- Kaka'ako United
- Shoguns
- Team XI
- Undertow

== Notable alumni ==
- Duke Hashimoto

== See also ==
- Hawaii Soccer Association
- United States Adult Soccer Association
- National Amateur Cup
- Soccer in the United States
