= Hawaii Soccer Association =

Hawaii governing body for soccer

- Formation: 1975
- Purpose: State Soccer Association
- Location(s): 94-718 Kaaoki Place Waipahu, Hawaii 96797
- President: Sergio Bolioli
- Vice President: Roger Thomas
- Treasurer: Michael Waring
- Website: https://www.hawaiisoccerassociation.com

The Hawaii Soccer Association (HSA) is Hawaii's official adult soccer body and the governing body of soccer in the state of Hawaii. It is affiliated with the United States Adult Soccer Association and the United States Soccer Federation, and U.S. Soccer lists it as one of its state associations.

== Divisions ==
The Hawaii Soccer Association is divided into several regional associations. Its adult league listings include Oahu's Coed 7-a-side and Coed Soccer Association of Hawaii alongside the Kauai Soccer Association and Maui Soccer Association. Each island administers its own soccer league.

- Kauai Soccer Association
- Maui Soccer Association
- Men's Island Soccer Organization
