= Soccer Alaska =

Governing body of amateur adult soccer in the state of Alaska, United States

- Formation: 1995
- Purpose: State Soccer Association
- Location(s): 6501 Changepoint Drive Anchorage, Alaska 99518
- President: Klaus Reich
- Website: http://socceralaska.com

Soccer Alaska is the governing body of amateur adult soccer in the state of Alaska, United States. They are not directly affiliated with FIFA or CONCACAF. They are affiliated to the Governing body of amateur adult soccer USASA.
