= North Texas Soccer Association =

- Formation: 1964
- Purpose: State Soccer Association
- Location(s): 3803 Parkwood Blvd. Suite 200 Frisco, Texas 75034
- President: Janet Campbell
- Vice President: Carlos Quinones
- Vice President: Erin Pfarner
- Treasurer: Dick Metivier
- Website: http://www.ntxsoccer.org/

North Texas Soccer Association, established in 1964, organises over 175,000 soccer players registered through over 123 member associations. It was formerly based in Carrollton, Texas, and is now based in Frisco, Texas. The Association is a member of the United States Youth and Amateur Soccer Associations, the United States Soccer Federation and FIFA.

== See also ==
- North Texas
