= James McGuire (soccer) =

American soccer player and administrator

Jimmy McGuire
Personal information
- Date of birth: 1911
- Place of birth: Edinburgh, Scotland
- Date of death: November 26, 1974 (aged 63)
- Place of death: New Hyde Park, New York, United States
- Height: 5 ft 9 1/2 in (1.77 m)
- Positions: Wing half; full back

Senior career*
Years	Team	Apps	(Gls)
1929–1931	Brooklyn Wanderers	82	(1)
1931	Celtic	0	(0)
1932–1936	Northampton Town	70	(?)
1936–1938	Brooklyn Celtic		
- * Club domestic league appearances and goals

James McGuire (1911 – November 26, 1974) was a two-time president of the United States Soccer Football Association. He played professionally in the American Soccer League and the English Football League. He also earned two schoolboy caps with Scotland and was inducted into the National Soccer Hall of Fame in 1951.

== Playing ==
McGuire was born in Edinburgh, Scotland and raised in Scotland where he played twice for the national team as a schoolboy. At some point, he moved to the United States. In 1929, he signed with the Brooklyn Wanderers of the American Soccer League. In 1931, Celtic toured North America, playing the Wanderers on June 7, 1931. McGuire impressed them enough for them to sign him before returning to Scotland. McGuire never appeared for their first team and in 1932, he moved to Northampton Town of the English Football League. McGuire played with Northampton Town until 1936. According to the National Soccer Hall of Fame, McGuire would return to play in the U.S. during the English off-season. When he left Northampton in 1936, McGuire returned to the U.S. for good, signing with Brooklyn St. Mary's Celtic of the second American Soccer League. In 1938, Brooklyn went to the final of the National Challenge Cup, but lost to Chicago Sparta. The next year, they defeated Chicago Manhattan Beer to win the Challenge Cup title. McGuire retired from playing professionally that summer.

== Administration ==
Following his retirement from playing, McGuire became an administrator. In 1947, he became the president of the American Soccer League. He also served as president of the United States Soccer Football Association (1952–1954 and 1971–1974). In 1974, he was part of the Organizing Committee for the 1974 FIFA World Cup. He died that year, while still president of the USSF.

McGuire was inducted into the National Soccer Hall of Fame in 1951. In 1975, the national U-19 cup was named the McGuire Cup in his honor. He died in Hyde Park, New York.
