= Major League Futsal =

Futsal league in the U.S.

Major League Futsal USA
- Founded: 2012; 14 years ago
- Country: United States
- Domestic cup: MLF Super Cup
- Current champions: Fuerza Deportiva
- Website: https://mlfusa.org/

Major League Futsal USA was the first professional futsal league in the United States. It was founded in 2012 by Rosario Lopez.

== History ==
MLF had two divisions: Division of Honor and Division 1, for both men and women. While 35 men's teams and 9 women's teams were listed by the company, 14 of these men's teams and 7 of women's did not play in the 2017 season.

The first exhibition season was played in 2015. A full season was contested in 2016 with a national tournament to conclude the season in August. Safira FC defeated KnowEns Futsal 5-1 in the final to claim the first league title.

Season two saw Detroit-based Waza Flo defeat Oregon Portland United in the championship.

== Teams ==
Team	Location	Metropolitan Area
Men's Professional Teams
BNC Futsal Club	Bethesda, Maryland	Washington, D.C.
Cleveland Xtreme	Cleveland, Ohio	Cleveland, Ohio
Columbus Futsal	Upper Arlington, Ohio	Columbus, Ohio
Dodge City Torros F.C.	Dodge City, Kansas	Dodge City, Kansas
Fuerza Deportiva F.C. Arizona	Phoenix, Arizona	Phoenix, Arizona
Inter Arizona F.C.	Phoenix, Arizona	Phoenix, Arizona
New Mexico Rhinos F.C.	Albuquerque, New Mexico	Albuquerque, New Mexico
Philadelphia Lions F.C.	Philadelphia, Pennsylvania	Philadelphia, Pennsylvania
Phoenix Brazas	Tempe, Arizona	Phoenix, Arizona
Phoenix Falcons USA	Avondale, Arizona	Phoenix, Arizona
Real Phoenix F.C.	Phoenix, Arizona	Phoenix, Arizona
Saint George Futsal	Bloomfield, Connecticut	Hartford, Connecticut
Tucson Amigos F.C.	Tucson, Arizona	Tucson, Arizona
Tyler City Futsal	Tyler, Texas	Tyler, Texas
Waza Flo	Novi, Michigan	Detroit, Michigan

== Champions ==
MLF Cup
Season	Champion	Runner-up	Result
2016	Safira FC	KnowEns Futsal	5-1
2017	Waza Flo	Portland United	

== See also ==
- Futsal in the United States
- Professional Futsal League
