= Volpi Foods =

Italian-American food producer and retailer

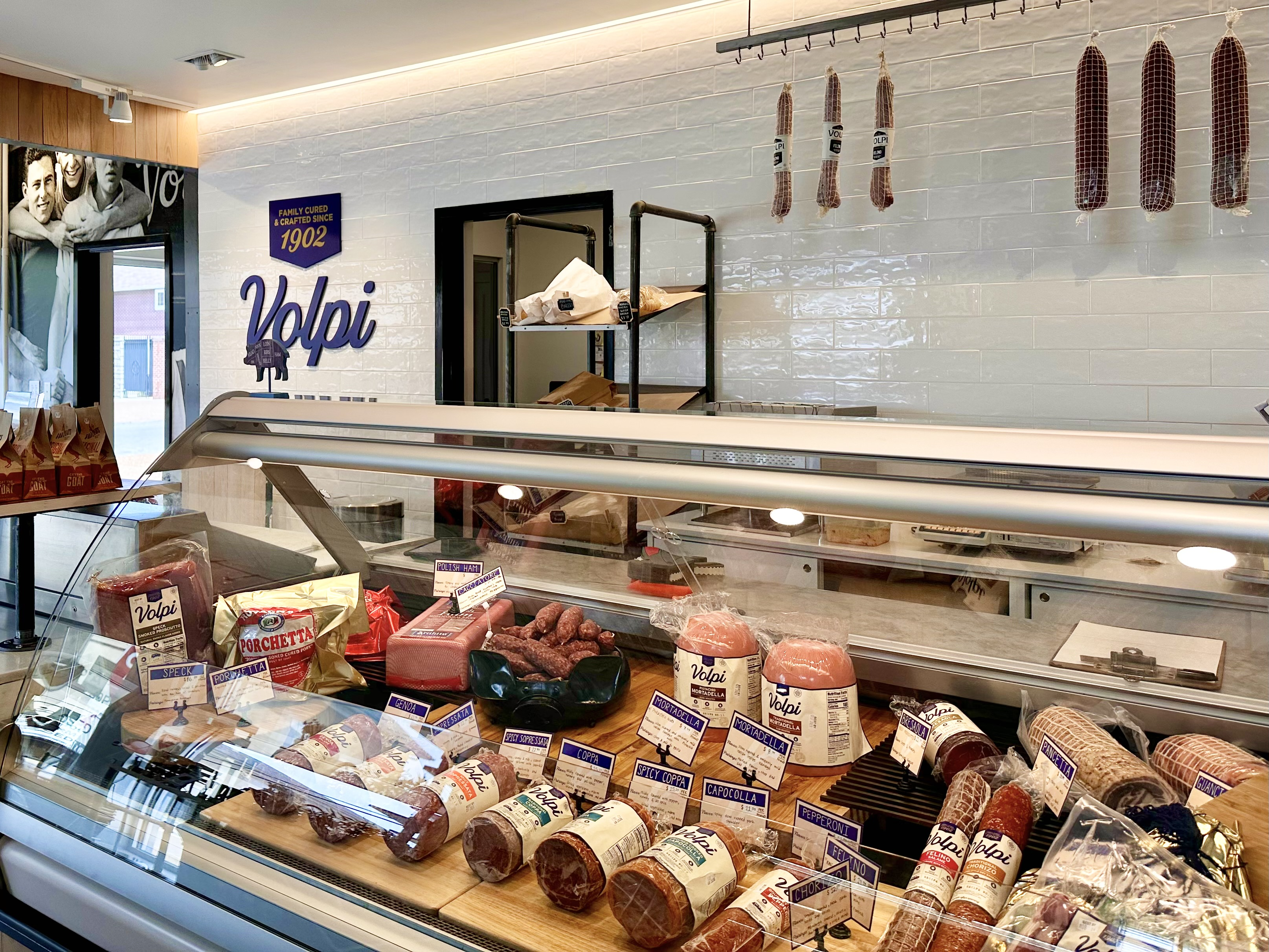
- Interior of Volpi's store on The Hill
- Formerly: The John Volpi Salami Manufacturing Company
- Industry: Salumeria
- Founded: 1902
- Founder: John Volpi
- Headquarters: 5256 Daggett Avenue, St. Louis, Missouri, United States
- Key people: John Volpi; Armando Pasetti; Lorenza Pasetti
- Products: Salami; Prosciutto
- Number of employees: 215 (2023)
- Website: https://www.volpifoods.com/

Volpi is an Italian–American salumeria producing cured meats based out of The Hill in St. Louis, Missouri. For over 120 years, the company has been family-owned and operated.

== History ==
The John Volpi Salami Manufacturing Company was founded in 1902 by John Volpi, an Italian immigrant from Milan. Having learned to cure meat and make sausage in Italy, he started by making cacciatore, a small salami to fit in the pockets of local coal miners.

John Volpi and his wife Maria Pasetti—a midwife who delivered innumerable Italian children—had no children themselves. They wrote back to Italy to find a relative who could help out at the family business and eventually take over. Armando Pasetti came to St. Louis in 1938 at the age of 14. After John Volpi died in 1957, Pasetti grew the business nationally.

Armando Pasetti met his future wife, Evelina, at his brother's wedding in Italy. Their daughter, Lorenza Pasetti, studied business and became the CEO of Volpi Foods in 2002.

In addition to being used at local restaurants like Gioia's Deli, Volpi meats are sold at deli counters at local grocery stores, such as Schnucks. In total, Volpi sells about 130 different products, all dry-cured meats.

In 2017, Volpi's shop was remodeled and expanded. Its expansion allowed more of its pre-packaged products to become available in nationwide in grocery stores like Trader Joe's and Publix, as well as convenience stores like Circle K and 7-Eleven. Volpi has also started selling into international markets.

Over 120 years after its founding, the company still operates at its original location on The Hill in St. Louis. The company is family-owned and has passed to the third and fourth generations of ownership and operation.

In 2020, Volpi's Heritage Prosciutto was a Good Food Awards winner.

== Sponsorship ==
The company serves as one of the primary sponsors for Jordan Anderson Racing, a NASCAR Xfinity Series team. The team first sponsored team driver/owner Jordan Anderson for two races in 2024, before expanding to five races in 2025 with Anderson, Austin Green, and Blaine Perkins.

== See also ==
- The Hill, St. Louis
- Salumeria
