= Sacramento Adult Soccer League =

The Sacramento Adult Soccer League (SASL) is an amateur soccer league located in Sacramento, California. The SASL is affiliated with the United States Adult Soccer Association (USASA) Region IV - California Soccer Association - North which stands as the 6th tier of the United States Soccer League System. Often teams are affiliated with local bars or clubs in and around Sacramento. The league has a Spring and Fall Season and holds and annual tournament known as the Gold Cup which is the largest men's adult soccer tournament in Sacramento.

== Organization ==
The SASL generally consists of an 18 & Over Division, 40 & Over Division and a 50 & Over Division. Depending on the number of teams, these divisions are sometimes split into a 1st and 2nd division with relegation and promotion. In the past the league has included other age brackets.
