= National Futsal Premier League =

- Current season, competition or edition: 2025–26 National Futsal Premier League season
- Sport: Futsal
- First season: 2018
- No. of teams: 12 (Men's); 3 (Women's)
- Country: United States
- Most recent champion: Brusa FC (2025–26)
- Website: nationalfutsalpremierleague.com

The National Futsal Premier League (NFPL) is a semi-professional futsal league in the United States. Founded in 2018, it operates regionally based conferences in the Midwest, Southwest, and West Coast.

The league is sanctioned by United States Adult Soccer Association (USASA) and plays according to FIFA futsal laws.

== History ==
The NFPL was founded in 2018 with the goal of creating a sustainable national league model. The league began with a focus on the Great Lakes region before expanding nationally.

=== 2025–26 expansion ===
For the 2025–26 season, the league launched the **California Division** (Men's and Women's) and expanded the **Southwest Division**. This marked the return of the NFPL Women's Division, featuring four Northern California clubs playing double-headers alongside their men's counterparts.

== Teams (2025–26 season) ==
As of the 2025–26 season, the league is divided into three regional conferences.

=== California Conference (men & women) ===
All four clubs in this conference field both men's and women's first teams.

Club	Location	Home Venue
Anthem Futsal	Rancho Cordova, CA	Omni Arena
Bay Area Footy PD	Redwood City, CA	Sequoia High School
HBK Futsal	San Jose, CA	Cubberley Community Center
Three Sixty Sala	Antioch, CA	ThreeSixty Sala Facility

=== Southwest Conference (men) ===
Club	Location	Home Venue
Brusa FC	Phoenix, AZ	Chandler-Gilbert Community College
Los Yunaites	Albuquerque, NM	Travel Team
NM Flagship Futsal	Rio Rancho, NM	West Mesa High School
Santa Fe Gloom	Santa Fe, NM	Genoveva Chavez Center

=== Midwest Conference (men) ===
Club	Location	Home Venue
Capital Futsal	Washington, D.C.	*Venue TBA
Futsal Factory Academy	Dexter, MI	Dexter Sports Complex
Inter Detroit	Detroit, MI	U of M Dearborn Fieldhouse
MitWest Futsal Club	Chicago, IL	*Venue TBA

== Champions ==
Season	Winner	Runner-up
2018	Futsal Indy	Ann Arbor Mudpuppies
2021–22	Grand Rapids OLé	Columbus Futsal
2022–23	FC Tryzub	Grand Rapids OLé
2023–24	Grand Rapids OLé	Colorado Futsal Academy
2024–25	Brusa FC	Futsal Factory Academy
2025–26	Brusa FC	NM Flagship Futsal Academy
