= Arizona State Soccer Association =

Sports governing body

- Formation: 1966
- Purpose: State Soccer Association
- Location(s): 2320 W Peoria Ave Ste. C123 Phoenix, Arizona 85029
- President: Regan McCook
- Vice President: Eric Teagan
- Treasurer: Timothy Barrett
- Website: http://azadult.soccer/

The Arizona State Soccer Association (ASSA) is the governing body of soccer in the state of Arizona.
