= Arkansas State Soccer Association =

Arkansas Soccer Association
- Formation: 1979
- Purpose: State Soccer Association
- Location: 9871 Brockington Rd. Suite 10 Sherwood, Arkansas 72120
- President: Scott Hendren
- Executive Director: Jim Walker
- Registrar: Marissa Hicks
- Treasurer: Rami Kassissieh
- Website: http://www.arkansassoccer.org/

The Arkansas Soccer Association is the governing body of soccer in the state of Arkansas. The organization was established in 1979 and the current executive director is Jim Walker.
