= Alabama Soccer Association =

Alabama soccer governing body

- Formation: 1980
- Purpose: State Soccer Association
- Location(s): 4678 Valleydale Road; Suite 200; Birmingham, Alabama 35242
- President: Doug Jackson
- Vice President: Russell Richey
- Treasurer: Jill Hopkins
- Website: http://www.alsoccer.org/

The Alabama Soccer Association (ASA) is the governing body of soccer in the state of Alabama.

ASA also administers the Alabama Adult State Cup, which serves as a qualifying platform for Region III of the United States Adult Soccer Association for qualification into the U.S. Open Cup.
