= Utah Soccer Association =

- Formation: 1978
- Purpose: State Soccer Association
- Location(s): 4476 Century Dr W Suite B Salt Lake City, Utah 84123
- President: Bill Bosgraaf
- Vice President: Patrick Halladay
- Website: https://www.utahsoccer.org

The Utah Soccer Association is the association for soccer and USASA affiliate in Utah. It promotes, oversees, and regulates amateur soccer in the state. It is also affiliated with FIFA, the world governing body of soccer. The Utah Soccer Association has five divisions, the first being the fifth division in U.S. soccer, and the last being the tenth.

== Leagues ==
Utah Soccer Association administers five divisions of adult amateur soccer that is affiliated with United States Adult Soccer Association. The leagues institute a system of promotion and relegation between them.

- Premiere Division
- First Division
- Second Division
- Third Division
- Fourth Division

== See also ==
- Utah Youth Soccer Association
