= Connecticut State Soccer Association =

- Formation: 1913
- Purpose: State Soccer Association
- Location(s): 11 Executive Drive Suite 203 Farmington, Connecticut 06032
- Website: http://www.northdakotasoccer.org/

The Connecticut State Soccer Association (CSSA) is the governing body of soccer in the state of Connecticut. The association also runs the Connecticut Soccer Hall of Fame.
