= Colorado Soccer Association =

Governing body of soccer in Colorado, U.S.

- Formation: 1978
- Purpose: State Soccer Association
- Location: 4643 S Ulster St, Ste. 250 Denver, Colorado 80237
- Chief Executive Officer: Nate Shotts
- Director of Operations: Said Mossavian
- Website: http://www.coloradosoccer.org

The Colorado Soccer Association is the governing body of soccer in the U.S. state of Colorado. The organization was established in 1978 and the current CEO is Nate Shotts.
