= West Hudson A.A. =

Former soccer team

West Hudson
- Full name: West Hudson Athletic Association
- Founded: 1905
- Dissolved: 1918; 108 years ago
- Ground: New Jersey
- League: NAFL
- 1917–18: 3rd.

The West Hudson Athletic Association (A.A.) (also known as the West Hudson Athletic Club (A.C.) or West Hudson Athletic Club Football (A.C.F.)) was one of the dominant U.S. soccer teams of the early twentieth century. Founded in 1905, the team won a 'triple' when they finished first in both the Metropolitan and New Jersey Association Football Leagues and captured the 1906 American Cup. The team won a “double” when it took the 1912 National Association Football League and American Cup titles. The team played in Harrison’s Federal League Park and competed in the National Association Foot Ball League (NAFL) for most of its existence.

== History ==
Located in northern New Jersey, West Hudson is the western portion of the Hudson County. This area was one of the earliest and strongest areas for American soccer, spawning dozens of teams from the towns of Harrison, Kearny and East Newark. The areas strength in soccer rested on two Scottish companies, Clark Thread Company and Michael Nairn & Company, which established their American operations in the area.

The two companies drew Scottish immigrants to their plants which then served as the basis for many of the areas powerhouse teams. In Harrison, the West Hudson A.A. drew its players from the city at large, rather than operating as a company team like many others in the area. On October 10, 1905, they were listed as a founding member of the Metropolitan Association Football League (MAFL) of New York City. In 1906, they won the American Cup, at the time considered the top level of U.S. competition. That fall, they entered the professional National Association Football League, promptly winning the league title.

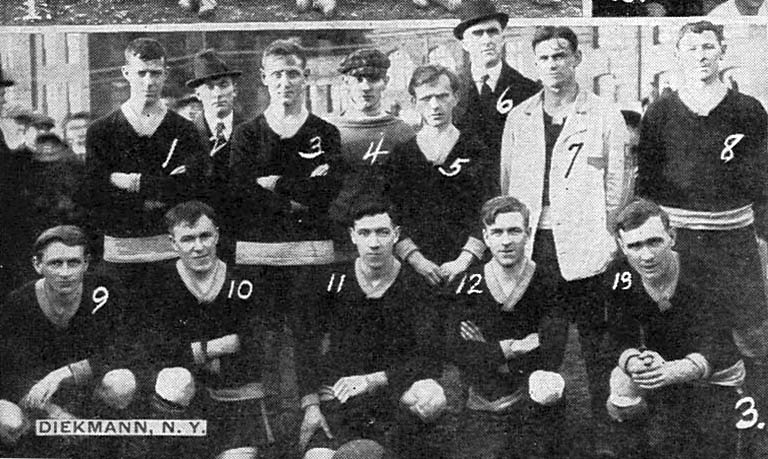
West Hudson team of 1917

Over the next decade, they ran off five total league titles and three cup championship, taking the first U.S. double in 1912. In 1909, six of the top U.S. teams joined to form the short lived, first Eastern Professional Soccer League (EPSL). The intent was to allow these teams to play against the best teams from other leagues and regions. The crowds were limited and after losing money, the league folded with most teams playing only five of the planned twelve matches. West Hudson was in third place when the league collapsed. In 1918, the U.S. entry into World War I led to the drain of players to military service. Several leagues elected to suspend operations, but the NAFL chose to continue playing. However, several teams found it too difficult to continue operations, among them West Hudson. Therefore, the team left the NAFL in 1918 and soon ceased operation.

== Year-by-year ==
Year	League	League Pos.	American Cup	N.C. Cup
1905/06	MAFL	1st	Champion	N/A
1906–07	NAFL	1st (Champion)	Second Round	N/A
1907–08	?	?	Champion	N/A
1908–09	NAFL	1st (Champion)	First Round	N/A
1909–10	NAFL	1st (Champion)	Third round	N/A
1909–10	EPSL	3rd	Third round	N/A
1910–11	NAFL	4th	Second Round	N/A
1911–12	NAFL	1st (Champion)	Champion	N/A
1912–13	NAFL	1st (Champion)	Third round	N/A
1913–14	NAFL	2nd	Quarterfinal	Did not enter
1914–15	NAFL	1st (Champion)	Semifinal	Third round
1915–16	NAFL	4th	?	Quarterfinal
1916–17	NAFL	5th	Final	Third round
1917–18	NAFL	3rd	Third Round	Semifinal

== Honors ==
- American Cup
  - Winner (3): 1906, 1908, 1912
  - Runner-up (1): 1917
- NAFL
  - Winner (6): 1906–07, 1908–09, 1909–10, 1911–12, 1912–13, 1914–15
  - Runner-up (2): 1909, 1914
