= Jersey A.C. =

Jersey Athletic Club, or Jersey A.C., was a U.S. soccer team which competed in the National Association Football League, winning two championships.

== History ==
In 1907, Jersey A.C., which had long fielded a successful cricket team entered a soccer team in the National Association Football League (NAFBL). They finished mid-table and withdrew at the end of the season. In 1908, Jersey A.C. returned to the NAFBL. In 1911, they won their second title. The team finished mid-table most seasons. With the entry of the United States into World War I, Jersey A.C. lost so many players to military service that it left the NAFBL in 1918 and ceased operations a year later.

== Year-by-year ==
Year	League	Reg. season	American Cup	National Challenge Cup
?	?	?	Second round	N/A
1907/08	NAFBL	5th	First round	N/A
1908/09	Ind.		Semifinal	N/A
1909/10	NAFBL	2nd	Third round	N/A
1910/11	NAFBL	1st	Second round	N/A
1911/12	NAFBL	5th	Second Round	N/A
1912/13	NAFBL	4th	Third round	N/A
1913/14	NAFBL	6th	Semifinal	Did not Enter
1914/15	NAFBL	2nd	Quarterfinals	First round
1915/16	NAFBL	6th	Quarterfinal	Second round
1916/17	NAFBL	1st	Quarterfinals	Second round
1917/18	NAFBL	8th	Second round	Second round
1918/19	?	?	Second round	Second round

== Honors ==
League Championship

- Winner (2): 1911, 1917
- Runner Up (2): 1910, 1915

New Jersey State Challenge Cup

- Runner Up (1): 1917
