= Bronx United =

- League: National Association Football League
- 1914–15: 4th

Bronx United were an early twentieth century American soccer team. It spent most of its existence as an amateur team and also played four complete seasons in the professional National Association Football League.

== League ==
Bronx United spent the 1908–1909 season in the New York State Football Association. The team finished ninth out of eleven teams in the Sunday League. Bronx United improved to fourth place the following season. In 1910, they went to the second round of the 1910 American Cup. The team then spent the 1910–1911 season in the New York State Amateur League First Division where they finished fourth. In the fall of 1911, they returned to the NAFBL, spending four seasons there. In 1912, Bronx United went to the third round of the American Amateur Football Association Cup where they forfeited to Newark F.C. The team's fourth and final season in the league in 1915 was their best when they finished fourth of nine competing teams. In 1915, the team fell to New York Clan MacDonald in the first round of the 1915 American Cup. United withdrew from the league at the end of that season, reverting to amateur status.

== Year-by-year ==
Year	League	Reg. season	American Cup	National Challenge Cup
1908–09	NYSFA	9th	DNE	N/A
1909–10	NYSAL	4th	Second round	N/A
1910–11	NYSAL	4th	First Round	N/A
1911–12	NAFBL	7th	First Round	N/A
1912–13	NAFBL	7th	First round	N/A
1913–14	NAFBL	10th	First Round	DNE
1914–15	NAFBL	4th	First round	Third round
