= 1909–10 American Cup =

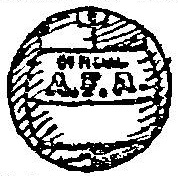

Tournament details
- Country: United States
- Teams: 29

Final positions
- Champions: Tacony (1st title)
- Runners-up: Scottish Americans

Tournament statistics
- Matches played: 37
- Goals scored: 139 (3.76 per match)

The 1909–10 American Cup was the 19th edition of the American Cup an annual challenge cup held by the American Football Association. Twenty-nine teams entered the competition. Tacony F.C. became champions of this edition after defeating the Scottish Americans 2-1 in the final round.

== Participants ==
| Name | City | League |
|---|---|---|
| West Hudson A.A. | Harrison | NAFL/ESL |
| True Blue F.C. | Paterson | NAFL |
| Rover F.C. | Fall River | ESL |
| Cameron | New York | NYAFL Sat/Sun |
| Clark A.A. | East Newark | NAFL |
| Paterson Rangers | Paterson | NAFL |
| Newark F.C. | Newark | NAFL/ESL |
| Clan McDonald | Brooklyn | NYAFL Sun |
| Reliance | New York |
| Wilberforce | Paterson | NAFBL |
| Hollywood Inn | Yonkers | NYAFL Sat |
| Scottish American | Newark | NAFL |
| Thistles | Philadelphia | ESL |
| Howard & Bullough | Pawtucket | ESL |
| Bronx United | New York | NAFL |
| Brooklyn | Brooklyn | NYAFL Sat |
| Jersey A.C. | Jersey City | AFA |
| Tacony F.C. | Philadelphia | PSL |
| Critchley | Brooklyn | NYAFL Sun |
| Arcadia Thistle | Brooklyn | NYAFL Sun |
| Clan MacDuff | New York | NYAFL |
| Camden A.C. | Camden |
| Ansonia | Ansonia |
| Ledgerwood | Brooklyn |
| Corinthians | Philadelphia |
| Celtic | New Jersey |
| Columbia Oval F.C. | New York |
| Philadelphia Hibernian | Philadelphia | ESL |
| Caledonians | Trenton |

NYAFL - New York State Amateur Association Football League
NAFL - National Association Football League
NEL - New England Association Football League
CCAFL - Capital City Association Football League
FBAP - Foot Ball Association of Pennsylvania
PSL – Pennsylvania State League
ESL – Eastern Professional Soccer League

== First round ==
The teams that drew first round byes were Tacony, Wilberforce, and Legerwood.

| October 16, 1909 | Hibernians | 5–0 | Trenton Caledonians | Philadelphia, PA |
| | G. Brown, 25'; Gallagher; Danks; McCormick | | | Referee: V. Kerns (Bloomfield) |

| October 23, 1909 | Corinthians | 2–2 | Clan MacDonald | Philadelphia, PA |
| | Crossley 3'; Dykes | | 18'; Glenn 55' |

| October 24, 1909 | West Hudson | 4–2 | Ansonia | West Hudson Athletic Ground Harrison, New Jersey |
| | McAllister 3'; Frankie Neil (pen.); Knowles; Lennox | | Simcox 40'; W.Smith 88' | Referee: Thomas Turner (Paterson) |

| October 30, 1909 | Howard & Bullough | 1–1 | Thistles | Sabin Street Grounds Pawtucket, RI |
| | E. Pemberton 80' | | Aleck Cairns 50' | Attendance: 1,000; Referee: Allen Montgomery |

| October 30, 1909 | Rovers | 3–1 | Hollywood Inn | Athletic Grounds Fall River, MA |
| | Harvey 8', 25'; Sunderland 11' | | Humes 80' | Attendance: 800; Referee: Dale |

| October 30, 1909 | Arcadia Thistle | 0–2 | Celtic | Visitation Oval Brooklyn, NY |
| | | | , |

| October 30, 1909 | Cameron | 0–3 | Camden A.C. | Camden, New Jersey |
| | | | Burrows 20', 30'; White 80' | Referee: B. Grove (Philadelphia) |

| October 31, 1909 | Newark | 0–3 | Scottish Americans | Morris Park Newark, New Jersey |
| | | | Richardson 40'; McNichol; Fenwick | Attendance: 1,500; Referee: J. Young (Philadelphia) |

| October 31, 1909 | Critchley | 0–0 | Brooklyn | Marquette Oval Brooklyn, NY |
| | | | | Referee: J. Nesbit (Caledonian Club) |

| October 31, 1909 | Reliance | 2–7 | Bronx United | Ontario Field New York, NY |
| | Brennen, | | Shand,, Lord; Renner; McPherson; Milne |

| October 31, 1909 | Columbia Oval | 1–5 | Jersey A.C. | Baseball grounds Jersey City, NJ |
| | Kuster | | Smith, Ramson, Joe Zehnbauer |

| October 31, 1909 | Clark A.A. | 2–2 | Rangers | Clark Athletic Ground East Newark, NJ |
| | Brownridge (1H); McCarthy (2H) | | (1H); Abhaus (2H) | Attendance: 300; Referee: Graham Winter |

| October 31, 1909 | Clan MacDuff | 0–4 | True Blue | Willard Park Paterson, New Jersey |
| | | | Morel; Joyce; Spinnler, | Referee: Allan Montgomery (Newark) |

=== Replays ===
| October 30, 1909 | Clan MacDonald | 1–2 | Corinthians | Marquette Oval Brooklyn, NY |
| | W. Glenn | | Young; Ashton | Referee: Mr. G. Phillips |

| November 7, 1909 | Brooklyn | 3–3 | Critchley | Brooklyn, NY |
| | ,, | | ,, |

| November 13, 1909 | Thistles | 3–3 | Howard & Bullough | Philadelphia, PA |
| | Aleck Cairns 12'; Johnny Young (pen.), | | Cannon 17'; Smith; E. Pemberton | Attendance: 2,000; Referee: Allen Montgomery |

| November 13, 1909 | Brooklyn | 2–1 | Critchley | Visitation Oval Brooklyn, NY |
| | S. Coward, | | J. Tait | Referee: J. Nesbit (Caledonian Club) |

| November 14, 1909 | Clark A.A. | 0–3 | Rangers | Clark Athletic grounds East Newark, NJ |
| | | | Scott 20' (pen.)); Christy Connors, | Referee: D.W. White (Brooklyn) |

| December 4, 1909 | Thistles | 2–0 | Howard & Bullough | Hibernian grounds Philadelphia, PA |
| | Watson 40' (pen.); Willie Cairns | | | Attendance: 1500; Referee: Allen Montgomery (Newark) |

== Second round ==
The second round draw took place at the Continental Hotel in Newark on November 6, 1909. The West Hudsons advanced on a forfeit as did the Rovers when the Thistles did not show up for the replay in Fall River.

| November 28, 1909 | Brooklyn | 1–1 | True Blue | Marquette Oval Brooklyn, NY |
| | S. Coward (pen.) | | A.M. Leach 50' | Referee: George Young (Chester) |

| November 28, 1909 | Jersey A.C. | 2–0 | Hibernian | Baseball grounds Jersey City, NJ |
| | C. Zehnbauer (pen.); Joe Zehnbauer 46' | | | Attendance: 500; Referee: Mr. Cuscik (Paterson) |

| November 28, 1909 | Rangers | 3–1 | Corinthians | Willard Park Patersona, NJ |
| | Christie (o.g.); Duncan; Ray Turner, | | Goal | Referee: Mr. White (Brooklyn) |

| November 28, 1909 | Scottish American | 4–0 | Camden | Wiedenmayer's Park Newark, NJ |
| | Hogan 5'; Montieth; McNichol; Fenwick | | | Referee: George Phillips (Trenton) |

| November 28, 1909 | West Hudson | w/o | Ledgerwood |

| November 28, 1909 | Wilberforce | 2–2 | Bronx United | Ryle Park Paterson, NJ |
| | Parting; Gillmore | | Hudson 5'; McPherson 80' | Referee: Montgomery (Newark) |

| December 11, 1909 | Thistles | 3–3 | Rovers | Philadelphia, PA |
| | Galbraith 5'; Johnny Young; Smith 80' | | Swords 13'; Elliott; Murphy | Attendance: 1300; Referee: D.W. White (Brooklyn) |

| December 11, 1909 | Tacony | 3–1 | Celtic | Tacony Ball Park Philadelphia, PA |
| | Kemp; McDonald, | | Flynn | Attendance: 500; Referee: J. Phillips (Trenton) |

=== Replays ===
| December 5, 1909 | Brooklyn | 1–3 | True Blue | Marquette Oval Brooklyn, NY |
| | S. Coward | | Morel 15'; McKersie; Martin | Referee: Mr. Young (Philadelphia) |

| December 5, 1909 | Wilberforce | 5–2 | Bronx United | Ryle Park Paterson, NJ |
| | Gillmore, Parting; Cummings; Metz | | Hudson, | Referee: Montgomery (Newark) |

| December 18, 1909 | Rovers | w/o | Thistles | Fall River, MA |

== Third round ==
The third round draw took place at the Continental Hotel in Newark on 4 December.

| February 6, 1910 | Jersey A.C. | 2–2 | Rovers | West Side Park Jersey City, NJ |
| | Waldron; Joe Zehnbauer | | Murphy 65'; Elliott 81' | Attendance: 300; Referee: D.H. White (Brooklyn) |

| February 6, 1910 | Scottish Americans | 1–0 | West Hudson | Wiedenmayer's Park Newark, NJ |
| | Mike Toman 65' | | | Attendance: 500; Referee: George Young |

| March 6, 1910 | Rangers | 1–4 | Tacony | Willard Park Paterson, NJ |
| | Bissett | | Hyslop 15', Smith; McDonald | Attendance: 1500; Referee: J. Mathews |

| March 13, 1910 | Wilberforce | 0–2 | True Blue | Ryle Park Paterson, NJ |
| | | | Morel 80'; Spinnler | Referee: Allan Montgomery (Newark) |

=== replay ===
| March 12, 1910 | Rovers | 1–0 | Jersey A.C. | Athletic grounds Fall River, MA |
| | Tommy Swords 10' | | | Attendance: 1200; Referee: D.H. White (Brooklyn) |

== Semifinals ==
| March 26, 1910 | Tacony | 2–1 | Rovers | Tacony baseball grounds Philadelphia, PA |
| | McDonald 30'; Smith 85' | | Harvey | Attendance: 3000; Referee: George Young (Chester) |

| March 27, 1910 | True Blue | 1–1 | Scottish Americans | Willard Park Paterson, NJ |
| | Holden | | Sproul 10' | Attendance: 3500; Referee: Philips (Trenton) |

=== replay ===
| April 3, 1910 | Scottish Americans | 5–1 | True Blue | Morris Park Newark, NJ |
| | Galley 15',, Fenwick 30'; Montieth 75' | | Martin 88' (pen.) | Attendance: 2000; Referee: George A. Phillips (Trenton) |

== Final ==
| April 24, 1910 | Scottish Americans (NJ) | 1–2 | Tacony F.C. (PA) | West Hudson Athletic Field Harrison, New Jersey |
| | Stewart 75' (pen.) | | MacDonald 10'; Mooreson 79' (pen.) | Attendance: 7,000; Referee: J. Nesbit (New York) |

== Champions ==

Tacony American Cup champions 1909–10.

Right to left: Hyslop, Kemp, Smith, Morley goal, Cairns gk), Lance, Potts, Allen, Morrison, McDonald(c), Small.

== American Cup bracket ==
First Round
(New Jersey) | Paterson Wilberforce | w/o
(New York (state)) | Reliance | 2
(New York (state)) | Bronx United | 7
(New York (state)) | Critchley | 0–3–1
(New York (state)) | Brooklyn United | 0–3–2
(New York (state)) | Clan MacDuff | 0
(New Jersey) | Paterson True Blues | 4
(New Jersey) | Newark FC | 0
(New Jersey) | Scottish Americans | 3
(New York (state)) | Cameron | 0
(New Jersey) | Camden A.C. | 3
(New Jersey) | West Hudson A.A. | 4
(Connecticut) | Ansonia | 2
Ledgerwood | w/o
(New Jersey) | Clark A.A. | 2–0
(New Jersey) | Paterson Rangers | 2–3
(Pennsylvania) | Pittsburgh Corinthians | 2–2
(New York (state)) | Clan MacDonald | 2–1
(Pennsylvania) | Tacony F.C. | w/o
(New York (state)) | Arcadia Thistle | 0
(New Jersey) | Celtic | 2
(New York (state)) | Columbia Oval F.C. | 1
(New Jersey) | Jersey A.C. | 5
(Pennsylvania) | Philadelphia Hibernian | 5
(New Jersey) | Trenton Caledonians | 0
(Rhode Island) | Howard and Bullough | 1–3–0
(Pennsylvania) | Thistle | 1–3–2
(Massachusetts) | Fall River Rovers
(New York (state)) | Hollywood Inn

Second Round
(New Jersey) | Paterson Wilberforce | 2–5
(New York (state)) | Bronx United | 2–2
(New York (state)) | Brooklyn United | 1–1
(New Jersey) | Paterson True Blues | 1–3
(New Jersey) | Scottish Americans | 4
(New Jersey) | Camden A.C. | 0
(New Jersey) | West Hudson A.A. | w/o
Ledgerwood
(New Jersey) | Paterson Rangers | 3
(Pennsylvania) | Pittsburgh Corinthians | 1
(Pennsylvania) | Tacony F.C. | 3
(New Jersey) | Celtic | 1
(New Jersey) | Jersey A.C. | 2
(Pennsylvania) | Philadelphia Hibernian | 0
(Pennsylvania) | Thistle | 3–
(Massachusetts) | Fall River Rovers | 3–w/o

Third Round
(New Jersey) | Paterson Wilberforce | 0
(New Jersey) | Paterson True Blues | 2
(New Jersey) | Scottish Americans | 1
(New Jersey) | West Hudson A.A. | 0
(New Jersey) | Paterson Rangers | 1
(Pennsylvania) | Tacony F.C. | 4
(New Jersey) | Jersey A.C. | 2–0
(Massachusetts) | Fall River Rovers | 2–1

Semifinals
(New Jersey) | Paterson True Blues | 1–1
(New Jersey) | Scottish Americans | 1–5
(Pennsylvania) | Tacony F.C. | 2
(Massachusetts) | Fall River Rovers | 1

Finals
(New Jersey) | Scottish Americans | 1
(Pennsylvania) | Tacony F.C. | 2

== See also ==
- 1909–10 NAFBL
- 1909–10 EPSL
- 1909–10 St. Louis Soccer League season
