= Philadelphia Hibernian =

Former soccer team from Pennsylvania

Philadelphia Hibernian, also known as Hibernian F.C., was an early twentieth century U.S. soccer team which played in Philadelphia, Pennsylvania.

== History ==
Philadelphia Hibernian was described as one of the leading teams in the East and were champions of Pennsylvania in five of the previous seven seasons. Hibernian finished fourth with a 1-3-1 record when it entered the newly established Eastern Soccer League in 1909. The league collapsed in 1910. In 1913, Hibernian won the Pennsylvania Soccer League title. They spent the 1914-1915 season in the American League of Philadelphia, going to the championship game where they lost 6-1 to Bethlehem Steel. They continued to play in the ALP in 1915-1916. Hibernian was one of the six clubs that played the 1916-1917 season in the American League of Association Football Clubs; the team played home games that season at the Phillies' National League Park. They won the 1920-1921 Allied American Football Association title.

== Record ==
Year	League	FinishLeague	American Cup	National Challenge Cup
1909-1910	ESL	4th	Second Round	N/A
1910-1911	?	?	Final	N/A
1911-1912	?	?	First Round	N/A
1912-1913	PSL	1st	Semifinal	N/A
1913-1914	?	?	Semifinal	?
1914-1915	ALP	2nd	?	?
1915-1916	ALP	?	First round	Third round
1916-1917	ALAFC	?	?	?
1917-1918	?	?	?	?
1918-1919	?	?	?	?
1919-1920	?	?	?	?
1920-1921	AAFA	1st	Third round	First round

== Honors ==
American Cup

- Runner Up (1): 1911

League Championship

- Winner (1): 1913

== Notable players ==
- Bart McGhee
- Thomas Swords
