= Paterson Wilberforce =

- Full name: Paterson Wilberforce Football Club
- Founded: 1909; 117 years ago
- Dissolved: 1914; 112 years ago
- League: National Association Football League
- 1913–14: Withdrew

The Paterson Wilberforce Football Club was a U.S. soccer team which played in the National Association Football League in the early twentieth century.

== History ==
Based out of Paterson, New Jersey, Wilberforce F.C. began as an amateur team. In 1909, Wilberforce joined the professional National Association Football League (NAFBL). While the first season went poorly for the team, they finished at the bottom of the standings, they quickly rose to the top three in the league the next three seasons. In 1914, Wilberforce began the season, but withdrew after eleven games.

== Year-by-year ==
Year	League	Reg. season	American Cup
1909/10	NAFBL	8th	Third Round
1910/11	NAFBL	2nd	Second Round
1911/12	NAFBL	2nd	Third Round
1912/13	NAFBL	3rd	Second Round
1913/14	NAFBL	Withdrew	First Round

== Honors ==
League Championship

- Runner Up (2): 1911, 1912
