= Victor F.C. =

Victor F.C. is a name used by at least two, and possibly three, U.S. soccer teams in the early twentieth century.

== Confusing names ==
Victor Talking Machine of Camden, New Jersey sponsored a team, known as Victor T.M. Another team, also known as Victor F.C., was based in South Bethlehem, Pennsylvania. There is a reference to another Victor F.C. playing in Philadelphia, Pennsylvania. This team could be either the team in Camden or the one in Bethlehem as Camden and Philadelphia sit adjacent to each other in the Philadelphia metropolitan area and Bethlehem teams frequently played in the Philadelphia leagues. However, this is unlikely as both Victor F.C. of Philadelphia and Victor T.M. of Camden played in the 1914-1915 Allied League.

== Competitive history ==
=== Victor Talking Machines F.C. ===
Victor T.M. was a member of the American League of Philadelphia during the 1914-1915 and 1915-1916 seasons.

=== Victor F.C. of Bethlehem ===
In 1916, the Victor F.C. of South Bethlehem entered the Blue Mountain League and were runners up for the 1918 Lewis Cup.

=== Unknown ===
In 1910, Victor F.C. won the Philadelphia and Suburban Association Foot Ball League. Four years later, it went to the quarterfinals of the 1914 American Cup. A year after that Victor F.C. went to the quarterfinals of the 1915 American Cup and the third round of the 1915 National Challenge Cup.
