= 1910–11 American Cup =

Soccer tournament

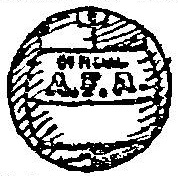

Tournament details
- Country: United States
- Dates: October 22, 1910 – April 23, 1911
- Teams: 28

Final positions
- Champions: Howard & Bullough (1st title)
- Runners-up: Philadelphia Hibernian

Tournament statistics
- Matches played: 41
- Goals scored: 136 (3.32 per match)

The 1910–11 American Cup was the annual challenge cup held by the American Football Association. Twenty-eight teams entered the tournament. Howard & Bullough of Pawtucket were the winners of this edition.

== Participants ==
Name	City	League
Ansonia	Ansonia
Arcadia Thistle	Brooklyn	NYAFL Sun
Birmingham F.C. Son's of St. George
Bronx United	New York	NAFL
Caledonians	Trenton
Cameron	New York	NYAFL Sat/Sun
Celtic	Brooklyn
Celtic	Philadelphia
Clan McDonald	Brooklyn	NYAFL Sun
Collinswood F.C.	New Jersey
Columbia Oval F.C.	New York
Critchley	Brooklyn	NYAFL Sun
Haledon Thistles	New Jersey
Howard & Bullough	Pawtucket	ESL
Hollywood Inn	Yonkers	NYAFL Sat
Jersey A.C.	Jersey City	AFA
Newburg FC	Pennsylvania
Paterson Rangers	Paterson	NAFL
Wilberforce	Paterson	NAFBL
Scottish American	Newark	NAFL
True Blue F.C.	Paterson	NAFL
Philadelphia Hibernian	Philadelphia	ESL
Tacony F.C.	Philadelphia	PSL
Thistles	Philadelphia	ESL
Vernon Lodge	Harrison
West Hudson A.A.	Harrison	NAFL/ESL

NYAFL - New York State Amateur Association Football League
NAFL - National Association Football League
NEL - New England Association Football League
CCAFL - Capital City Association Football League
FBAP - Foot Ball Association of Pennsylvania
PSL – Pennsylvania State League
ESL – Eastern Soccer League

== First Round ==
The draw for the first round took place on September 10, 1910. Collingswood, Cameron, Scottish American, and Wilberforce drew byes.

October 16, 1910	Haledon Thistle	1–4	Tacony	Wilard Park Paterson, New Jersey
	Canova		Kemp, Dawson,	Referee: Allan Montgomery

October 23, 1910	Ansonia	1–1	Bronx United	Hotchkiss Field Ansonia, CT
	Goal		Goal

October 23, 1910	True Blue	2–1	Newburg	Willard Park Paterson, New Jersey
	Laurie; Leech		McPherson

October 29, 1910	Philadelphia Thistle	3–1	Hollywood Inn	Philadelphia, PA
	Jimmy Kerr; Cankie Cairns; Ashton		Gibbs	Referee: David Gould

October 29, 1910	Philadelphia Celtic	1–3	Caledonian	Philadelphia, PA
	McNichol 87'		Bentley; Birchenough 60'; J. Smith	Referee: G. Young

October 30, 1910	Clan McDonald	2–0	Vernon Lodge	Marquette Oval, Brooklyn
	Peters; Orr			Referee: M. Cussack

October 30, 1910	Rangers	1–1	Hibernian	Olympic Park Paterson, New Jersey
	Alex Bissett 87'		M. Garvey

October 30, 1910	Columbia F.C.	0–1	Brooklyn Celtic	West Hudson Oval Harrison, New Jersey
			MacPherson	Referee: Andrew Laurie

October 30, 1910	Birmingham F.C.	2–2	Brooklyn	Wiedenmayer's Park Newark, New Jersey
	Garrett; Nichols		,

October 30, 1910	Arcadia Thistle	0–0	Howard & Bullough	Morris Park Newark, New Jersey
				Referee: Montgomery

October 30, 1910	Critchley	0–0	Jersey A.C.	Edison Field Brooklyn, New York
				Referee: J. White

October 30, 1910	Newark F.C.	2–3	West Hudson	Morris Park Newark, New Jersey
	30’ McMahon (pen.); John Leggett		Lennox 25'; Carter 60'; Ford 65' (pen.)	Attendance: 2,000; Referee: George Phillip (Trenton)

=== replays ===
October 30, 1910	Bronx United	2–2	Ansonia	Bronx Oval Bronx, New York
	,		,

November 5, 1910	Hibernian	2–0	Rangers	Philadelphia, PA
	Gallagher 75'; Smith			Referee: Bernstein (Brooklyn)

November 5, 1910	Howard & Bullough	5–1	Arcadia Thistle	Sabin Street grounds
	Brown 37'; McKay, Harvey,		McKenzie	Referee: Montgomery (Newark)

November 6, 1910	Brooklyn	2–2	Birmingham F.C.	Edison Field Brooklyn, New York
	Kirby; Milne		Woodward; Compton (pen.)	Referee: W. Williams

November 6, 1910	Jersey A.C.	3–0	Critchley	Jersey City Baseball grounds
	,,Pall 40' (0.g.)			Attendance: 200

November 12, 1910	Brooklyn	6–1	Birmingham F.C.	Harrison Oval
	Kirby 1', Watts; Opperman; Coward; Maclennan		Foster/Proctor 60'	Referee: A. Montgomery

November 13, 1910	Bronx United	1–3	Ansonia	Harrison Oval
	Goal		Tomlinson; Neilson; Stevens	Referee: J. Davis (Jersey City)

== Second round ==
The second round draw took place November 5, 1910 at the Continental hotel in Newark, NJ. The Ansonia–Brooklyn match was ordered replayed because Ansonia used an ineligible player.

November 24, 1910	Clan MacDonald	0–0	Brooklyn Celtic	Marquette Oval

November 24, 1910	Collingwood	0–2	Scottish American	Philadelphia, PA
			Montieth 10', 75'	Referee: Philips

November 26, 1910	Hibernian	4–1	Jersey A.C.	Philadelphia, PA
	Hinds 10'; Waltemate; Scott, 88'		Tait	Referee: Dale (Paterson)

November 26, 1910	Howard & Bullough	2–1	West Hudson	Sabin Street grounds Pawtucket, RI
	Harvey 25'; Handling 86'		Carter 60'	Attendance: 1000; Referee: Gore (New Bedford)

November 26, 1910	Caledonian	3–3	True Blue	Hetzel Field, Trenton, NJ
	Harrison 20', Bentley 60'		Leitch 3'; John Montgomery 88'	Referee: George Young (Chester, PA)

November 27, 1910	Ansonia	4–3	Brooklyn	Hotchkiss Field Ansonia, CT
	Simcox, Stevens; Tomlinson		,,	Attendance: 500; Referee: Montgomery (Kearney, NJ)

November 27, 1910	Wilberforce	0–1	Tacony	Olympic Park, Paterson
			McDonald 25' (pen.)	Attendance: 2000; Referee: Burnside (Brooklyn)

November 27, 1910	Cameron	0–4	Thistle	Harrison Oval, Newark
			,,,

=== replays ===
December 4, 1910	Celtic	0–2	Clan MacDonald	Celtic Park, Brooklyn
			Ross; Peters

December 4, 1910	True Blue	6–1	Caledonian	Willard Park, Paterson
	Laurie (1H), Dearne; Montgomery; Leach		Cooper (1H)	Referee: Young (Philadelphia)

January 1, 1911	Brooklyn	1–3	Ansonia	Visitation Oval, Brooklyn
	Danielson		,,

== Third round ==
December 26, 1910	Tacony	1–0	Thistle	Philadelphia, PA
	Dawson 89'			Attendance: 2000; Referee: Phelps

December 31, 1911	Howard & Bullough	2–2	True Blue	Sabin Street grounds
	E. Pemberton; McKay		Laurie (pen.); Dearn 30'	Attendance: 1200; Referee: White (Brooklyn)

January 2, 1911	Hibernian	3–3	Clan MacDonald	Philadelphia, PA
	Smith 15'; Godfrey; Gallagher		Thomson; Falls; Hoyle (pen.)	Referee: Allen Montgomery (Newark)

January 22, 1911	Ansonia	1–0	Scottish American	Hotchkiss Field, Ansonia, CT
	Stevens 28'			Referee: Nesbit (NY)

=== replays ===
January 8, 1911	Clan MacDonald	1–2	Hibernian	Marquette Oval, Brooklyn
	Saull		Smith; Burroughs	Referee: Allen Montgomery (Newark)

January 8, 1911	True Blue	1–1	Howard & Bullough	Willard Park, Paterson
	A. Montgomery		J. Blakely	Referee: White (New York)

January 22, 1911	True Blue	1–2	Howard & Bullough	Harrison Oval,
	Dearn 20'		Harvey; Pemberton	Attendance: 2500; Referee: D.H. White (Brooklyn)

== Semifinals ==
March 4, 1911	Hibernian	3–1	Ansonia	Philadelphia, PA
	Godfrey, Danks		Simcox 40'	Attendance: 8,000; Referee: Phillips (Trenton)

March 4, 1911	Howard & Bullough	2–1	Tacony	Sabin Street grounds
	McKay 21'; Smith 27'		Kemp 69'	Attendance: 3000; Referee: AJ Burnside (Brooklyn)

== Final ==
April 9, 1911	Philadelphia Hibernian (PA)	1–1	Howard & Bullough (RI)	Morris Park Newark, New Jersey
	Harry Burroughs 70'		Michael Cannane 80'	Attendance: 8,000; Referee: Harry Dale (Paterson)

=== replay ===
April 23, 1911	Philadelphia Hibernian (PA)	1–3	Howard & Bullough (RI)	Morris Park Newark, New Jersey
	Burrows 60'		McKay 46'; Harvey (pen.); Harvey 76'	Attendance: 6,000; Referee: Harry Dale (Paterson)

Hibs: GK O'Donnell, RF Danks, LF Wilson(c), RMF Waltermate, CMF Blaney, LMF Tillie, OR Burroughs, IR Godfrey, CF Gallagher, IL Smith, OL Hinds.
H&B: GK Healey, RF O'Toole(c), LF Donnelly, RMF Creighton, CMF Brown, LMF Blakely, OR Harvey, IR McKay, CF W.Pemberton, IL E.Pemberton, OL Cannan.

== Champions ==

Howard & Bullough 1911 American Cup Champions.

== American Cup bracket ==
First Round
(Pennsylvania)	Philadelphia Hibernian	1–2
(New Jersey)	Paterson Rangers	1–0
(New York (state))	Critchley	0–0
(New Jersey)	Jersey A.C.	0–3
(New York (state))	Clan MacDonald	2
(New Jersey)	Vernon Lodge	0
(New York (state))	Columbia Oval F.C.	0
(New York (state))	Brooklyn Celtic	1
(Connecticut)	Ansonia	1–2–3
(New York (state))	Bronx United	1–2–1
(New Jersey)	Birmingham F.C.	2–2–1
(New York (state))	Brooklyn FC	2–2–6
(New Jersey)	Collinswood	bye
(New Jersey)	Scottish Americans	bye
(New York (state))	Arcadia Thistle	0–1
(Rhode Island)	Howard and Bullough	0–5
(New Jersey)	Newark FC	2
(New Jersey)	West Hudson	3
(Pennsylvania)	Philadelphia Celtic	1
(New Jersey)	Trenton Caledonians	3
(New Jersey)	Paterson True Blues	2
(New Jersey)	Newburg FC	1
(New Jersey)	Paterson Wilberforce	bye
(New Jersey)	Haledon Thistles	1
(Pennsylvania)	Tacony	4
(New York (state))	Cameron	bye
(Pennsylvania)	Philadelphia Thistle	3
(New York (state))	Hollywood Inn	1

Second Round
(Pennsylvania)	Philadelphia Hibernian	4
(New Jersey)	Jersey A.C.	1
(New York (state))	Clan MacDonald	0–2
(New York (state))	Brooklyn Celtic	0–0
(Connecticut)	Ansonia	4
(New York (state))	Brooklyn FC	3
(New Jersey)	Collinswood	0
(New Jersey)	Scottish Americans	2
(Rhode Island)	Howard and Bullough	2
(New Jersey)	West Hudson	1
(New Jersey)	Trenton Caledonians	3–1
(New Jersey)	Paterson True Blues	3–6
(New Jersey)	Paterson Wilberforce	0
(Pennsylvania)	Tacony	1
(New York (state))	Cameron	0
(Pennsylvania)	Philadelphia Thistle	4

Third Round
(Pennsylvania)	Philadelphia Hibernian	3–2
(New York (state))	Clan MacDonald	3–1
(Connecticut)	Ansonia	1
(New Jersey)	Scottish Americans	0
(Rhode Island)	Howard and Bullough	2–1–2
(New Jersey)	Paterson True Blues	2–1–1
(Pennsylvania)	Tacony	1
(Pennsylvania)	Philadelphia Thistles	0

Semifinals
(Pennsylvania)	Philadelphia Hibernian	3
(Connecticut)	Ansonia	1
(Rhode Island)	Howard and Bullough	2
(Pennsylvania)	Tacony	1

Finals
(Pennsylvania)	Philadelphia Hibernian	1–1
(Rhode Island)	Howard and Bullough	1–3

== See also ==
- 1910–11 NAFBL
- 1910–11 St. Louis Soccer League season
