= 1911–12 American Cup =

Soccer tournament

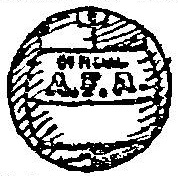

Tournament details
- Country: United States
- Dates: October 1911 – April 1912
- Teams: 35

Final positions
- Champions: West Hudson (3rd title)
- Runners-up: Paterson Rangers

Tournament statistics
- Matches played: 34
- Goals scored: 104 (3.06 per match)

The 1911–12 American Cup was the twenty–first edition of the challenge cup held by the American Football Association.

== Pre-Season ==
The new officers for this season were elected at a meeting at the Continental Hotel in Newark on May 27, 1911. John Watt the former president was now Honorary President, John Lone was president, A.M. Brown of Philadelphia was Vice–President, Harry Craig of Paterson was Treasurer, Andrew N. Beveridge was Secretary, and Duncan Carswell was recording secretary. This was a pivotal year for the AFA which was aligned with the English FA. The touring Corinthians team was part of the Amateur Football Alliance and not a member of the English FA. The AFA was instructed by the English FA to bar teams from playing in any matches with the 'outlaw' Corinthians at the risk of expulsion. As a result, Newark was suspended for a year for playing a match with the Corinthians on September 18, 1911, at Morris Park, Newark. The New York State League expelled Bronx United because they pulled a player from the New York State League select team's match against the Corinthians played on September 16, 1911, at the Polo Grounds. Newark, having withdrawn from the National Association Football League, was replaced with Bronx United. The New York State League in a retaliatory moved started their own tournament and renamed themselves the American Amateur Football Association The AFA now had a rival organization and tournament to compete with. Newark, now a member of the New York Amateur League in place of Bronx United, went on to win that championship and finished runner–up in the AAFA Cup. Newark's home field, Morris Park, was selected as the site of the AFA cup final, an all New Jersey match between the Paterson Rangers and West Hudson.

== Participants ==
There were 35 total participants although there were eight withdrawals in the first round and one in the preliminary.

Name	City	League
Ansonia	Ansonia	CSL
Arcadia Thistle	Brooklyn	NYAFL
Brooklyn	Brooklyn	NAFL
Bronx United	New York	NAFL
Caledonian	Trenton, NJ	PSL
Celtic	Brooklyn	NYAFL
Celtic	Pittsburgh	PSL
Clan MacDonald	New York	NYAFL
Clan MacDuff	New York	NYAFL
Collingwood	Collingwood	PSL
Columbia Oval	New York	NYAFL
Critchley	New York	NYAFL
Fore River	Quincy	NEL
Gloucester Hibernian	Gloucester	PSL
Gorham	Providence	NEL
Hollywood Inn	New York	NYASL
Howard and Bullough	Pawtucket	NEL
Jersey A.C.	Jersey City	NAFL
J.P. Coats	Pawtucket	NEL
Mount Vernon	Mount Vernon	NYAFL
Olympic	Paterson	AAFA
Park City	Bridgeport	CSL
Philadelphia Hibernian	Philadelphia	PSL
Rangers	Paterson	NAFL
Rovers	Fall River	NEL
Scottish Americans	Newark	NAFL
Tacony	Philadelphia	PSL
Tennyson	Tennyson	PSL
Thistle	Philadelphia	PSL
Thistle	Haledon	AAFA
True Blues	Paterson	NAFL
Victor	Victor	PSL
West Hudson	West Hudson	NAFL
Wilberforce	Paterson	NAFL
Wissinoming	Wissinoming	PSL

AAFA – American Amateur Football Association
CSL – Connecticut State League
ESL – Eastern Soccer League
NAFL – National Association Football League
NYAFL – New York State Amateur Association Football League
NEL – New England Association Football League
PSL – Pennsylvania State League

== Preliminary round ==
The draw was held September 23, 1911 at the Continental hotel in Newark, NJ. The 35 teams were divided up into Pennsylvania, New England, and New York/New Jersey districts only for the preliminary round to bring the total to 32 teams for the first round.
New York/New Jersey District

October 14, 1911

Mt. Vernon	w/o	Jersey A.C.

Pennsylvania District

October 7, 1911

Tennyson	0–3	Collingwood
		Liggett (3)

Philadelphia, PA

New England District

October 14, 1911

Park City	6–2	Ansonia
Haight (4)

Steeplechase Park, Bridgeport, CT

== First round ==
October 28, 1911

Hollywood Inn F.C.	w/o	J&P Coats

October 28, 1911

Victor	w/o	Critchley

Philadelphia, PA
October 28, 1911

Wilberforce	w/o	Clan McDuff

October 28, 1911

Brooklyn Celtic	w/o	Brooklyn

Brooklyn, NY
October 28, 1911

Collingwood	w/o	Columbia Oval

October 28, 1911

Jersey A.C.	w/o	Clan MacDonald

October 28, 1911

Olympic	w/o	Arcadia Thistle

October 28, 1911

Caledonian	w/o	Gorham

October 28, 1911

Celtic	5–0	Gloucester Hibernian
G. Brown (4); Starkey

Fairhill Park, Philadelphia, PA
Referee: G. Philips (Trenton)
October 28, 1911

Thistle	1–0	Bronx United
20' Young

Washington Park, Philadelphia, PA
Referee: J. Young
October 28, 1911

Haledon Thistle	1–4	Wissinoming
2H' Turner		3' McArthur; 1H' Radcliffe; 2H' Radcliffe; 2H' Fleming

Willard Park
Referee: Laurie (Newark)
October 28, 1911

Park City	0–1	Howard & Bullough
		Brannan

Steeplechase Park, Bridgeport, CT
Referee: Alex Montgomery (Newark)
October 29, 1911

True Blues	0–0	Fore River

Willard Park, Paterson, NJ
Attendance: 1500
Referee: Montgomery
October 29, 1911

Rangers	3–1	Hibernian
10' Spinnler; 1H' George Bissett; 2H' Spinnnler		85' Logue

Olympic Park, Paterson, NJ
Attendance: 500
Referee: Nesbitt
October 29, 1911

Scottish America	1–1	Rovers
47' Fenwick		70' Proctor

Wiedenmayer's Park, Newark, NJ
Attendance: 1000
Referee: D.M. White (Brooklyn)
October 29, 1911

West Hudson	2–1	Tacony
17' Johnny Tait; 50' Bob Lennox		Hector MacDonald

Harrison Oval
Attendance: 1180
Referee: A. Burnside

replays

November 4, 1911

Fore River	3–0	True Blues
1H' Moran; 1H' Harrison; D. McDonald

Quincy, MA
Attendance: 1000
Referee: Montgomery (Newark)
November 4, 1911

Rovers	2–1	Scottish American
2' Lynn; 60' Proctor		40' York

Athletic Field, Fall River, MA
Attendance: 1875
Referee: D.M. White (Brooklyn)

== Second round ==
The draw for the second round was held on November 11, 1911, at the Continental hotel in Newark, NJ.

November 25, 1911

J&P Coats	1–2	West Hudson
2H' Boots		13' Tait; 26' Tait

Lonsdale Avenue grounds
Attendance: 1500
Referee: A.J. Burnside (Brooklyn)
November 25, 1911

Rovers	2–2	Brooklyn
23' Albert Lynn; 60' L. Gauthier		30' McClellan; 81' Gillette

Athletic grounds, Fall River, MA
Attendance: 1000
Referee: Moore (Pawtucket)
November 25, 1911

Wissinoming	1–0	Thistle
43' Radcliffe

Wissinoming Ball Park
Referee: B. Groves (Philadelphia)
November 25, 1911

Collingwood	0–1	Fore River
		75' Harrison

Philadelphia, PA
Referee: D.M. White (Brooklyn)
November 26, 1911

Jersey A.C.	3–4	Wilborforce
Tommy Gorman; Charlie Zehnbauer; Smith (pk)		Leadbetter; Leadbetter; Tom Fisher (pk); 84' Ford

West Side Park, Jersey City, NJ
Referee: Allan Montgomery
November 26, 1911

Rangers	2–2	Caledonian
35' McNair		44' Cameron; Darragh (og); 70' Eyers (pk)

Olympic Park, Paterson, NJ
Attendance: 1200
Referee: Nesbitt
November 30, 1911

Victor	3–1	Celtic
Beech; Heinbecker; Newton		Jack Taylor

Philadelphia, PA
Referee: G. Young (Chester)
November 30, 1911

Howard & Bullough	3–0	Olympic
35' Hemingray; Daley; Simcox

Sabin street grounds
Attendance: 2000
Referee: Ecelles (New Bedford)

replays

December 2, 1911

Caledonian	0–2	Rangers
		Spinnler; McNair

Hill's Grove, Trenton, NJ
Referee: John Nesbitt
December 2, 1911

Brooklyn	7–0	Rovers
20' Black; 30' Van der Weghe; 60' Black; 65' Adamson; Adamson; Black; Black

Marquette Oval, Brooklyn, NY
Referee: Moore (Pawtucket)

== Third round ==
The draw for the third round was held on December 2, 1911, at the Continental hotel in Newark, NJ. The Rangers–Wissinoming match was ordered replayed because the referee had to stop the game on three occasions to move the crowd off the field for interfering with the players.

December 23, 1911

Howard & Bullough	1–1	Fore River
37' Bennett		35' Harrison

Sabin street grounds
Referee: Gregson (Worcester)
December 31, 1911

West Hudson	3–0	Wilberforce
5' Tait; 15' Tait; 88' Carter

Harrison, NJ
Attendance: 1000
Referee: David M. White (Brooklyn)
January 28, 1912

Brooklyn	1–2	Victor
McClellan		85' Newton (pk); 88' Harold Beech

Marquette Oval, Brooklyn, NY
Referee: Andrew Laurie (Newark)
February 11, 1912

Rangers	1–0	Wissinoming
Ferguson (pk)

Olympic Park
Referee: Montgomery

replays

December 31, 1911

Fore River	1–1	Howard & Bullough
Harrison		85' McKay

Quincy, MA
Referee: Gregson (Worcester)
February 24, 1912

Howard & Bullough	2–1	Fore River
32' McKay; 77' Daley		43' Harrison (pk)

Lonsdale avenue grounds
Attendance: 2000
Referee: Andrew Lawrie (Newark)
February 25, 1912

Rangers	4–1	Wissinoming
21' McNair; 40' Johnny Young; 57' Ferguson (pk); Spinnler		86' Young

Olympic Park
Attendance: 2000
Referee: Allen Montgomery

== Semifinals ==
The second Victor–West Hudson replay required two 15–minute overtime periods.

March 2, 1912

Victor	1–1	West Hudson
Tom Gaynor		20' Lennox

Philadelphia, PA
Referee: Burnside (Brooklyn)
March 16, 1912

Howard & Bullough	0–1	Rangers
		88' A. Coul

Sabin street grounds
Referee: Andrew Laurie

replays

March 10, 1912

West Hudson	3–3	Victor
35' Lennox (pk); 48' Johnny Tait; 83' Bob McKay		20' Wright; 30' Bob Robinson; 63' Tom Gaynor

Harrison, NJ
Referee: Alex Burnside (Brooklyn)
March 23, 1912

Victor	0–1	West Hudson
		OT' Carter

Tacony Ball Park
Referee: Alex Burnside (Brooklyn)

== Final ==
The West Hudsons and Rangers were both members of the National League. West Hudson was in first place with the Rangers vying for third place. West Hudson had an edge in the season series having won an exhibition game while splitting their two National League games with a win each.

April 14, 1912

West Hudson	1–0	Rangers
22' James Cooper

Morris Park, Newark, NJ
Attendance: 5000
Referee: David White (Brooklyn)

== Champions ==

West Hudson A.A. 1912. National League and American Cup Champions.

== See also ==
- 1912 American Amateur Football Association Cup
- 1911-12 NAFBL
- 1911–12 St. Louis Soccer League season
