= New York Clan MacDonald =

Defunct association football team

The New York Clan MacDonald were a Scottish American professional soccer club. They spent several seasons in both the National Association Football League and New York State Football Association.

== History ==
In 1907, Clan MacDonald joined the National Association Football League (NAFBL). They finished sixth and withdrew from the NAFBL, joining the New York State Football Association (NYSFA). The NYSFA was broken into a Saturday and Sunday league. The Clan MacDonald won the Sunday league, but lost to Hollywood Inn F.C. of the Saturday league in the championship game. In 1913, they rejoined the NAFBL, playing through the end of the 1914-1915 season. While they registered with the league prior to the 1915-1916 season, they withdrew before the first game of the season. In 1913, Clan MacDonald went to the semifinals of the American Amateur Football Association Cup.

== Year-by-year ==
Year	League	Reg. season	American Cup	National Challenge Cup
1907/08	NAFBL	6th	Third Round	N/A
1908/09	NYSFA	2nd	Third round	N/A
1909/10	NYSFA	1st	First Round	N/A
1910/11	NYSFA	2nd	Third round	N/A
1911/12	NYSFA	2nd	First Round	N/A
1912/13	?	?	Did not enter	N/A
1913/14	NAFBL	3rd	First Round	Did not enter
1914/15	NAFBL	5th	Second Round	First round
1915/16	?	?	Second Round	First round
1916/17	NYSFA	2nd	Semifinal	Second round

== Honors ==
- League Championship

- Champions (1): 1910
- Runner Up (4): 1909, 1911, 1912, 1917

- New York State Cup

- Runner Up (1): 1911
