= Paterson Rangers =

United States Soccer Team

Paterson Rangers was a U.S. soccer team which played in Paterson, New Jersey during the early twentieth century. They spent two seasons in New York’s Metropolitan Association Football League and nine in the National Association Football League

== History ==
The origins of the Paterson Rangers is unknown, but they entered the Metropolitan Association Football League for the 1904-1905 season and on April 25, 1905 lost to the New York Caledonians in the semifinals of the New York State Cup. In 1906, the Rangers joined the professional National Association Football League and remained in that league until 1915. They also competed in their first American Cup in 1906. No records for the Rangers exist after the 1914–15 season.

== Year-by-year ==
Year	League	Standing	American Cup	National Challenge Cup
1904/05	MAFL	?	?	N/A
1905/06	MAFL	?	First Round	N/A
1906/07	NAFBL	6th	First Round	N/A
1907/08	NAFBL	2nd	First Round	N/A
1908/09	NAFBL	6th	Second Round	N/A
1909/10	NAFBL	7th	Third round	N/A
1910/11	NAFBL	3rd	First Round	N/A
1911/12	NAFBL	4th	Final	N/A
1912/13	NAFBL	8th	Second Round	N/A
1913/14	NAFBL	5th	First Round	DNE
1914/15	NAFBL	7th	?	Third Round

== Honors ==
National Association Football League

- Runner Up (1): 1908

American Cup

- Runner Up (1): 1912

Clan MacDonald Cup

- Winner (1): 1909
