= Disston A.A. =

Former soccer team from Philadelphia, Pennsylvania

Philadelphia Tacony Disston Athletic Association Football Club, better known as Disston A.A. and nicknamed The Sawmakers was a U.S. soccer team sponsored by the Disston Saw Works company of Philadelphia, Pennsylvania. The team played for several years in local Philadelphia tacony leagues before joining the National Association Football League. It was a perennial contender in both league and cup play until 1921. No known records exist for the team after that year.

== History ==
The Disston Saw Works, founded by Henry Disston in 1840, was a company which had facilities in Philadelphia's Kensington neighborhood and later moved to the neighborhood of Tacony. At some point, it created an athletic association, known as the Disston Athletic Association, for company employees. The Disston A.A. included a soccer team, known as the Disston A.A.F.C. Depending on the source, the team was also known as Philadelphia Tacony, Tacony F.C., Tacony Disston, and Philadelphia Disston. These all refer to the same team.

The early history of the team is obscure, but it spent several years in local Philadelphia amateur and semi-professional leagues. In 1910, it began winning a string of league and cup titles beginning with the American Cup. From 1910 to 1912, they played in the Football Association of Philadelphia, winning two championships. They played the 1913-1914 season in the Allied American Football Association of Philadelphia. They then played in the American Soccer League of Philadelphia in 1915-1916, winning the league title, before moving to the National League of Philadelphia for the 1916-1917 season. In 1917, Disston A.A. went professional when it entered the National Association Football League . The loss of players to military service in World War I led to the collapse of several leagues and teams. While Disston did not end operations, in 1918 it did leave the NAFBL for a season. That year, it also won the Philadelphia city championship. Disston rejoined the NAFBL in 1919 and played the next two seasons. In 1921, the league folded when several teams jumped to the newly established American Soccer League. Disston decided against joining the ASL.

== Year-by-year ==
| Year | League | Reg. season | American Cup | National Challenge Cup |
|---|---|---|---|---|
| 1909/10 | PSL | 1st | Champion | N/A |
| 1910/11 | FAP | 1st | Semifinal | N/A |
| 1911/12 | FAP | 1st | First Round | N/A |
| 1912/13 | ? | ? | Final | N/A |
| 1913/14 | AAFA | 4th | Final | First round |
| 1914/15 | AAFA | ? | Quarterfinals | Second round |
| 1915/16 | ASLP | 1st | ? | Second round |
| 1916/17 | ALP | 1st | ? | Semifinal |
| 1917/18 | NAFBL | 3rd | Semifinal | Third round |
| 1918/19 | ? | 3rd | Second Round | First round |
| 1919/20 | NAFBL | 7th | Round of 16 | Second round |
| 1920/21 | NAFBL | 7th | ? | Second round |

== Honors ==
- American Cup
  - Winners (1): 1910
  - Runners-up (2): 1913, 1914
- Allied Amateur Cup
  - Winners (1): 1918
- League Championship
  - Winners (3): 1911, 1912, 1916
  - Runner-up (1): 1918
