= 1906–07 National Association Foot Ball League season =

National Association Foot Ball League
- Season: 1906–07
- Champion(s): West Hudson A.A. (1st title)
- Matches: 101

Statistics of National Association Foot Ball League in season 1906–07.

Gordon withdrew early in season. Kearny stars withdrew January 1907. Essex County withdrew 1/28/1907. After the season, Kearny A.C., and West New York withdrew.

== League standings ==
| Position | Team | Pts | Pld | W | L | T | Remarks |
|---|---|---|---|---|---|---|---|
| 1 | West Hudson A.A. | 39 | 23 | 19 | 3 | 1 | |
| 2 | Kearny Scots | 37 | 23 | 17 | 2 | 4 | |
| 3 | Paterson True Blues | 32 | 20 | 14 | 2 | 4 | |
| 4 | Newark F.C. | 32 | 20 | 14 | 2 | 4 | |
| 5 | East Newark Clark A.A. | 27 | 21 | 13 | 7 | 1 | |
| 6 | Paterson Rangers | 23 | 19 | 10 | 6 | 3 | |
| 7 | Kearny A.C. | 16 | 20 | 8 | 12 | 0 | |
| 8 | West New York Burns Club | 16 | 16 | 8 | 8 | 0 | |
| 9 | Newark Hearts | 14 | 19 | 7 | 12 | 0 | |
| -- | Essex County F.C. | 5 | 10 | 2 | 7 | 1 | Dropped out January 28, 1907 |
| -- | Kearny Stars | 3 | 7 | 1 | 5 | 1 | Dropped out January 1907 |
| -- | Gorden Rangers | 0 | 3 | 0 | 3 | 0 | Dropped out early |

== See also ==
- 1907 American Cup
