= Paterson True Blues =

Soccer team from New Jersey, U.S.

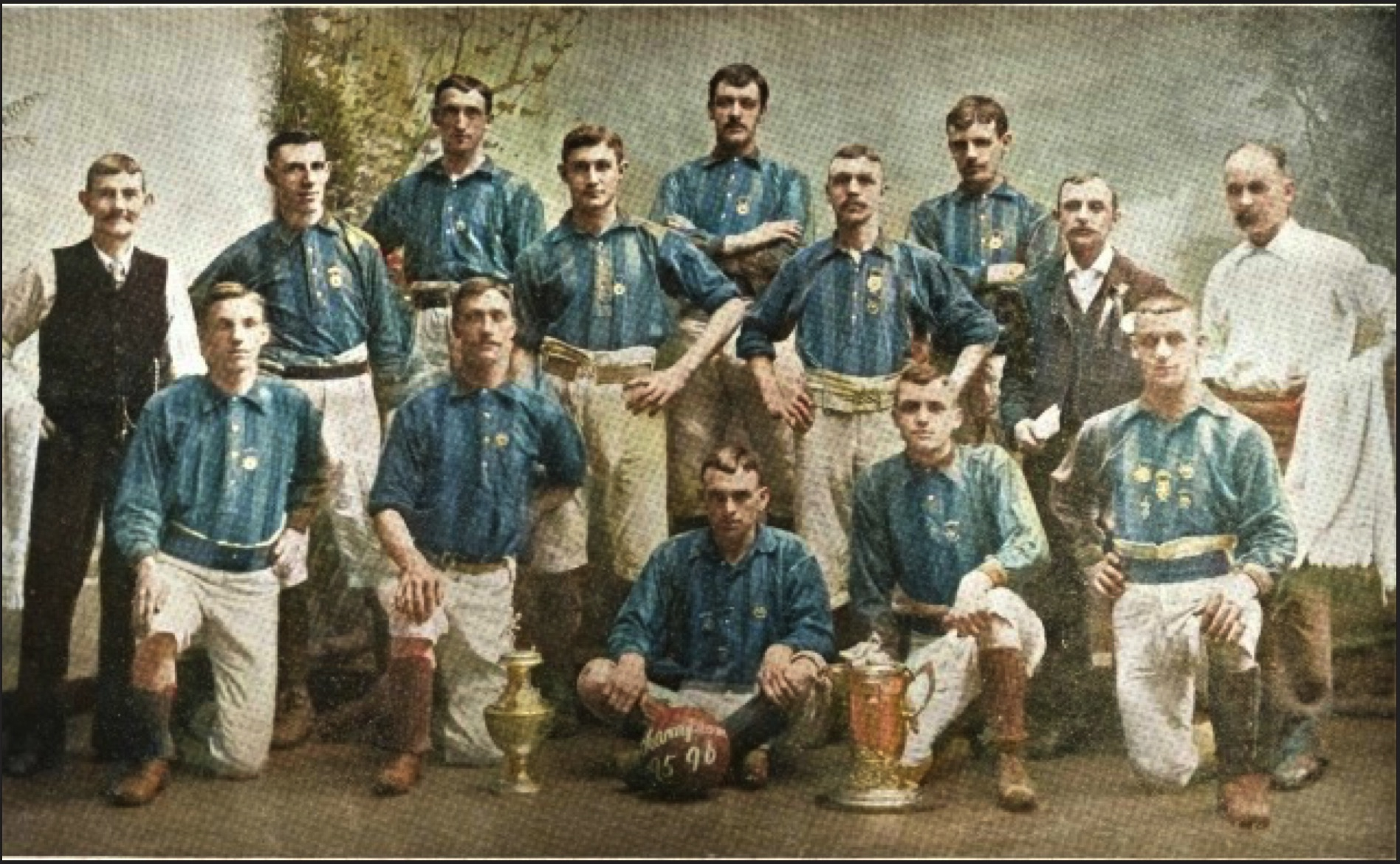
- Full name: Paterson True Blues Football Club
- Founded: 1887
- Dissolved: c. 1915; 111 years ago
- Ground: New York City
- League: NAFL
- 1914–15: 9th (withdrew)
Home colors

Paterson True Blues was a professional U.S. soccer team founded in 1887 and disestablished after 1915. The True Blues, based out of Paterson, New Jersey, are best known as one of the dominant soccer teams of its era and one of the first U.S. soccer dynasties.

== History ==
In the late 19th century, the northern New Jersey area of Paterson, Kearny and Newark began producing dozens of talented teams which drew their rosters from the region's textile mills, the True Blues themselves were born in 1887. Their first near success came in the 1894 American Football Association’s American Cup.

That year, Paterson went to the final before falling to the Fall River Olympics. Paterson won its first Cup title in [[1895-96 American Cup]1896]] under coach John Watt, their second in 1909, while the third was in 1913 with coach John Hall. In 1897, Paterson joined the National Association Football League, the top professional league in the U.S. at the time.

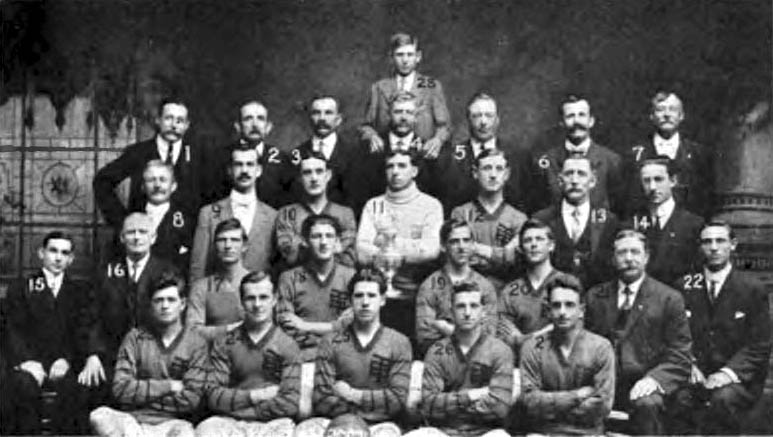
Team of Paterson of 1913

Paterson immediately established itself as the best in the league, taking the championship in its first season. Paterson won its second league title the next season, but around the start of the 20th century, soccer in the U.S. went into a brief decline. As a result, both the NAFBL and the American Cup were suspended. The Cup resumed play in 1906 and the NAFBL the same year.

They rejoined the NAFBL and remained in the league until 1915. In December 1913, Paterson traveled to St. Louis to match up against the best of the St. Louis Soccer League.

They fell in their first game against an SLSL All Star team before defeated Columbian Athletic Club and tying St. Leo's, the city’s dominant team. After finishing the 1914-1915 NAFBL season at the bottom of the standings with an 0-14-2 record, Paterson withdrew from the league.

== Year-by-year ==
Year	League	League Pos.	American Cup
1892–93	?	?	First Round
1893–94	?	?	Final
1894–95	?	?	Semifinal
1895–96	?	?	Champion
1896–97	?	?	Final
1897–98	NAFL	1st (Champion)	DNE
1898–99	NAFL	1st (Champion)	N/A
1899–00	? (Note: The NAFL did not organise championships from 1899 to 1906.)	?	N/A
1900–01	?	?	N/A
1901–02	?	?	N/A
1902–03	?	?	N/A
1903–04	?	?	N/A
1904–05	?	?	N/A
1905–06	?	?	Final
1906–07	NAFL	3rd	Semifinals
1907–08	NAFL	4th	Final
1908–09	NAFL	4th	Champion
1909–10	NAFL	5th	Semifinal
1910–11	NAFL	6th	Quarterfinals
1911–12	NAFL	3rd	First Round
1912–13	NAFL	2nd	Champion
1913–14	NAFL	8th	Quarterfinal
1914–15	NAFL	9th	First round

== Honors ==
- American Cup
  - Winner (3): 1895–96, 1908–09, 1912–13
  - Runner-up (4): 1893–94, 1896–97, 1906, 1907–08
- NAFL
  - Winner (2): 1897–98, 1898–99
  - Runner-up (1): 1912–13
