= Neil Clarke (soccer) =

Scottish American soccer player

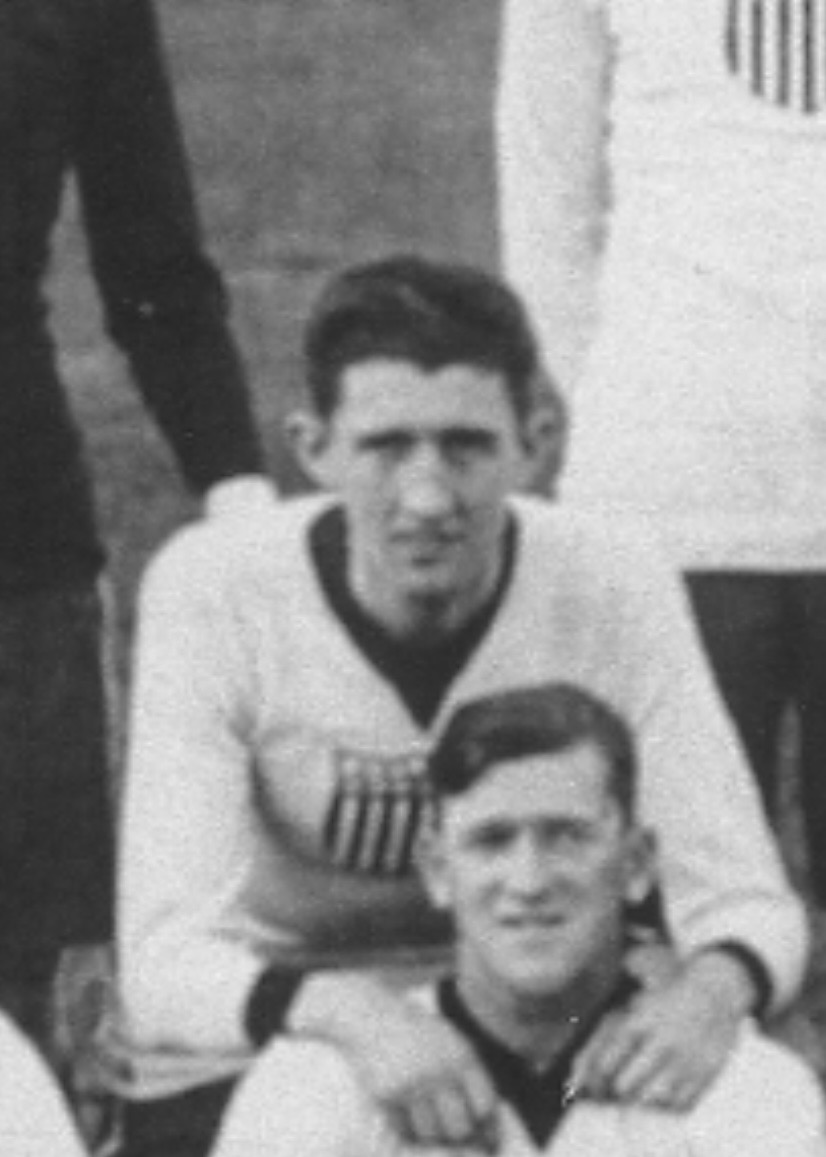

Personal information
- Full name: Neil Gallacher Clarke
- Date of birth: September 27 1889
- Place of birth: Paisley, Renfrewshire, Scotland
- Date of death: August 8 1960 (aged 70)
- Place of death: Darby Township, Pennsylvania, U.S.
- Positions: Forward; fullback

Senior career*
Years	Team	Apps	(Gls)
- Celtic
1913	Paterson True Blues		
1913–1914	Brooklyn Field Club		
1914–1916	Bethlehem Steel		
1917–1918	Babcock & Wilcox		
1918	Fall River Rovers		
1920–1921	Robins Dry Dock		
1921–1922	Todd Shipyard	9	(2)
1922–1923	Fall River F.C.	2	(0)
1923–1925	Philadelphia Field Club	58	(0)

International career
1916	United States	2	(0)
- * Club domestic league appearances and goals

Neil Gallacher Clarke (sometimes listed as Clark) (born in Scotland) was a Scottish American soccer player who began his career in the Scottish Football League before migrating to the United States. He played in both the National Association Football League and American Soccer League, and won numerous American Cup and National Challenge Cup honours. In 1916, he played in the first two U.S. national team games.

== Professional career ==
Clarke began his career as a center forward but later moved to center half back. He played for Celtic in the Scottish Football League. In 1913, now based in the United States, he was with the Paterson True Blues of the National Association Football League (NAFBL) when Paterson won the American Cup finals against Diston The first game and first replay both ended in ties with Clarke scoring the tying goal in both games. In the second replay, Paterson won, 2–1, to take the Cup. He then moved to Brooklyn Field Club, winning the 1914 National Challenge Cup with them.

In 1914, Clarke is listed with Bethlehem Steel. In 1915 and 1916, Bethlehem won the National Challenge Cup. It was around this time that he was referred to as the "king of centrehalf backs." He then moved to Babcock & Wilcox for a single season before moving to the Fall River Rovers of the Southern New England Soccer League in 1918. That year, Clarke was with Fall River when they lost the National Challenge Cup final to Bethlehem Steel. In 1920 and 1921, he played for Robins Dry Dock, which won the 1921 Challenge Cup, and American Cup.

In 1921, the American Soccer League replaced the NAFBL as the top U.S. league. Todd Shipyards, the parent company of Robins Dry Dock, took over sponsorship of the team, renaming Todd Shipyard. The team folded at the end of the 1921–1922 season, and Clarke moved to the Fall River F.C. He saw little playing time and in 1923, he made his last move, this time to the Philadelphia Field Club. He left the ASL in 1925.

== National team ==
Clarke earned two caps with the U.S. national team in 1916. In the first official U.S. national team game, the U.S. defeated Sweden on 20 August 1916. On 3 September 1916, Clarke and his teammates drew with Norway before returning to the U.S.

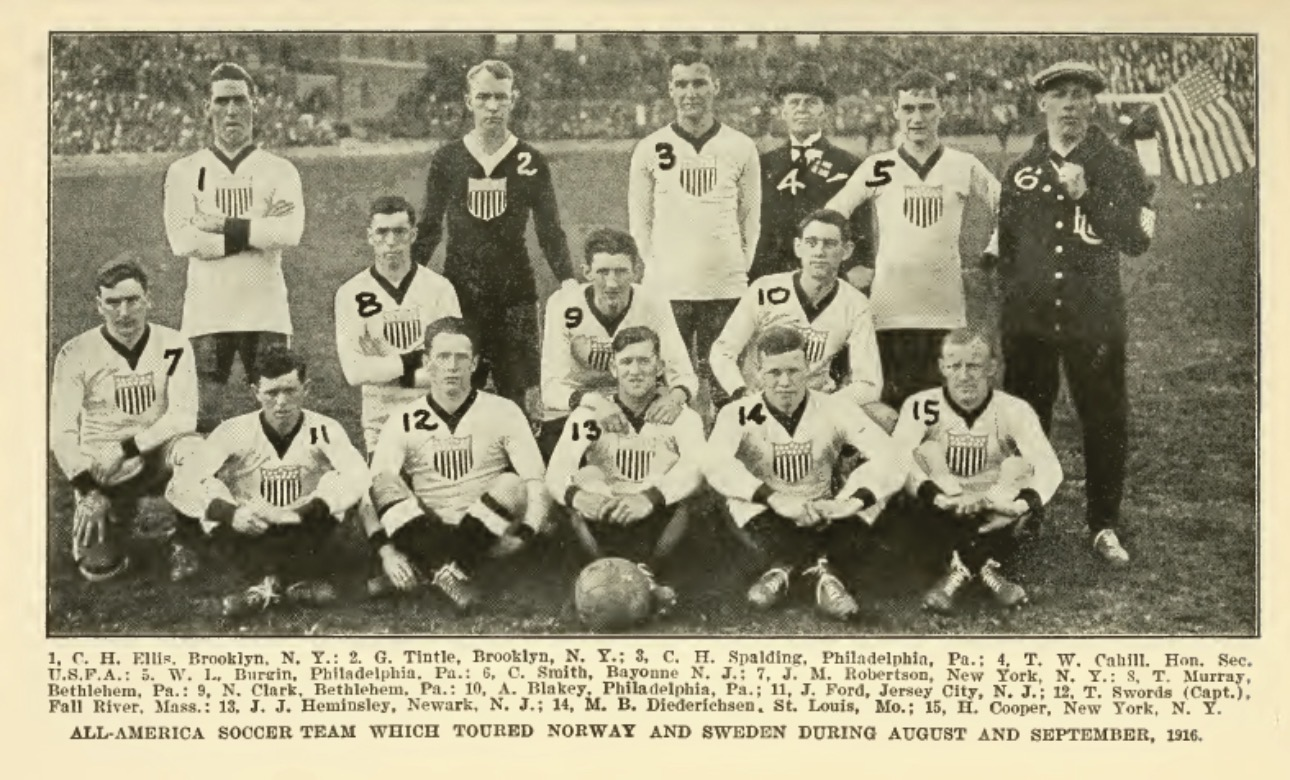
United States Men’s Soccer Team on Scandinavian tour

== Honours ==
Paterson True Blues

- American Cup: 1912–13
- National Association Football League runner-up: 1912-13

Brooklyn Field Club

- National Challenge Cup: 1913–14
- National Association Football League: 1913-14

Bethlehem Steel Football Club

- National Challenge Cup
  - Winners: 1914–15, 1915–16
  - Runners-up: 1916–17
- American Cup: 1915–16, 1916–17
- ALAFC: 1914-15

Babcock & Wilcox

- New Jersey State Challenge Cup: 1917

Fall River Rovers

- National Challenge Cup runner-up: 1917-18
- Times Cup: 1917

Brooklyn Robins Dry Dock

- National Challenge Cup: 1920-21
- American Cup: 1920–21

== See also ==
- List of United States men's international soccer players born outside the United States
