= 1906 American Cup =

Soccer tournament

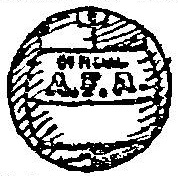

Tournament details
- Country: United States
- Teams: 13

Final positions
- Champions: West Hudson (1st title)
- Runners-up: True Blue

Tournament statistics
- Matches played: 17
- Goals scored: 93 (5.47 per match)
- Top goal scorer: Louis Miller (6)

The 1906 American Cup was the fifteenth edition of the soccer tournament organized by the American Football Association. After being inactive for several years, the AFA reorganized in February 1906 with eight initial entries from the New Jersey towns of Harrison, Paterson, Kearny, and Newark. At their February 13 meeting at the Caledonian House in Paterson it was decided to send additional invitations to Metropolitan league teams. On February 17 at the Cosmopolitan Park House in East Newark Hal A. Holden of Kearny was elected president, Harry Craig of Paterson as treasurer, Peter Martin(Bronx Rangers) as vice-president, Herbert Turner of Paterson as recording secretary, James Allen Jr. of O.N.T. as financial secretary and Dr. John W. Reid as honorary president. On February 24, exhibition games between the West Hudsons of Harrison and Pan Americans of Fall River coincided with the association meeting at Cosmopolitan Hall in order to have a representative, in this case C.C. Murphy, present for New England clubs wishing to join the tournament. On this occasion four additional teams from the Metropolitan district joined bringing the total to twelve. Entries were open until March 3. John Swithenby who was in possession of the old trophy donated it to the association to once again award it to the winner of the tournament.

== Entries ==
There were thirteen participants in the 1906 AFA tournament.

Name	City	League	Manager	Grounds
Caledonian	Kearny, NJ	AFA	H.Holden	Cosmopolitan Park
Celtic A.C.	East Newark, NJ	NJAFL	William Harrison	Cosmopolitan Park
Celtic	Paterson, NJ	NJML	-	Ryle Park
Hibernian	Harrison, NJ	NJAFL	-	Harrison Oval
O.N.T.	Kearny, NJ	AFA	-	Cosmopolitan Park
Rangers	Bronx, NY	MAFL	-	Bronx Oval
Rangers	Paterson, NJ	MAFL	W.Mulholen	Ryle Park
Riverside	Kearny, NJ	AFA	J.Swithenby	Cosmopolitan Park
Robert Burns Society	New York, NY	AFA	-	Equitable Park
Scottish American	Kearny, NJ	NJAFL	Samuel Reynolds	Wiedenmayer's Park
Stars	Kearny, NJ	AFA	-	Cosmopolitan Park
True Blue F.B.C.	Paterson, NJ	NJAFL/MAFL	D.MacMillan	Ryle Park
West Hudson	Harrison, NJ	NJAFL/MAFL	Robert Marshall	Cosmopolitan Park

NJAFL - New Jersey Association Football League, MAFL - Metropolitan Association Football League, NJML - New Jersey Minor League

== First round ==
The first round draw took place at the AFA meeting in Swithenby's Hotel on Saturday March 3, 1906. On Wednesday March 6 at Ford's Hall in Kearny the association met to select the referees for the first round matches and were scheduled to reconvene at Evan's Hall in Kearny on March 19 at the close of the first round. Bronx Rangers, Riverside, and Scottish Americans drew byes. The Celtic-O.N.T. match was protested because the referee had the teams play ten minutes extra time each way after a regulation tie. The game was ordered replayed because that rule had not passed the sanction of the AFA.

March 11, 1906	Paterson Celtics	4–2	O.N.T.	Paterson, NJ
3:00PM	Turner; Burns; M. Menamy		Holden; Saggis	Stadium: Ryle Park; Referee: William Ritchie (Paterson)
Note: Celtic: GK Granson, FB Barr, Boydell, HB Nesbit, M.Menamy, Critchley, RW Turner, Townsley, C Scott, LW Muller, Burns. O.N.T.: GK McCormick, FB Allen, Rumble, HB Coaliclough, Saggis, Holden, RW Belt, Lennox, C R.McMillan, LW Hopkinson, W.McMillan.

March 18, 1906	East Newark Celtics	0–0	Stars	East Newark, NJ
				Stadium: Cosmopolitan Park; Attendance: 700; Referee: Patrick J. Hughes (Kearny)
Note: Celtic: GK Conover, FB Miller, Brockey, HB Reid, Bennett, F.Hackett, RW Holden, Kettles, C Henn, LW Riker, F.Hughes. Stars: GK Parker, FB Brown, Tallman, HB Smith, Kennedy, McCarthy, RW McCabe, Murphy, C Hearn, LW Boyle, Arndt.

April 1, 1906	Robert Burns Club	5–3	Caledonians	New York, NY
	Robertson; Taylor; Wilson; Hunter,		Partridge, Parks	Stadium: Equitable Park; Referee: James Hood (East Newark)
Note: Burns: GK Warburton, LB Dewar, RB Lawrence, LHB Robertson, CHB Leonard, RHB A.Robertson, OL Golighty, IL Wilson, CF Hunter, IR Taylor, OR McDonald. Caledonian: GK W.Partridge, LB Healy, RB Kennedy, LHB R.Holden, CHB McCarty, RHB J.Partridge, OL Brown, IL Rowley, CF Parks, IR Duff, OR R.W.R. Holden.

April 1, 1906	Hibernians	3–5	West Hudson	Newark, NJ
	Vincent (1H); Lennox (2H)		Magee (1H); McClung (2H); Greenhaigh (2H); Gorman (2H); J.Marshall (2H)	Stadium: Morris Park; Referee: David Shaw (Paterson)
Note: Hibernian: GK Gunderman, FB Brindle, Eccles, HB Christie, Lennox, Scott, RW Mulvey, Miller, C Vincent, LW Swiss, Hibbitts. West Hudson: GK Hayes, FB McMahon, John Donald, HB J.Brown, Neil, Young, RW McClung, Magee, C Gorman, LW Greenhaigh, J.Marshall.

April 1, 1906	True Blue	4–1	Paterson Rangers	Paterson, NJ
3:15PM	Oldfield (1H); Spencer (1H)		Murray	Stadium: Ryle Park; Attendance: 1,200; Referee: Montgomery (Newark)
Note: True Blues: GK Miller, LFB Taylor, RFB Cockran, LHB Beattie, CHB Tommy Murray, RHB Smith, OL Tommy Turner, IL Harry Lauder, C Bobby Spencer, IR Jimmie Oldfield, OR Johnny Howarth. Rangers: GK Garside, LFB John Campbell, RFB J.Martin, LHB Lawson, CHB Mason, RHB Finigan, OL George Murray, IL Conners, C Dunn, IR Inglis, OR Tommy Piecey.

=== replays ===
March 24, 1906	O.N.T.	10–3	Paterson Celtics	Newark, NJ
3:00PM	W. McMillan 60', 64' (1H); Young (1H), 89'; R.McMillan 74', 90'; Fairweather 75'; Waters 81'		Manary 5'; McCurry (1H); T.Wingate (2H)	Stadium: Cosmopolitan Park; Referee: William Ritchie (Paterson)
Note: Celtic: GK Greyson, LFB Barr, RFB Boydell, LHB McMinnery, CHB McCurry, RHB Townsley, LW Wingate, LW B.Burns, C T.Wingate, RW Turner, RW Manary. O.N.T.: GK Gordon, LFB Sansom, RFB Murray, LHB A.Burns, CHB Saggis, RHB Allan, LW Waters, LW Charles Young, C Robert McMillan, RW Fairweather, RW W.McMillan.

April 1, 1906	East Newark Celtics	3–2	Stars	East Newark, NJ
	Seddon 30' (pen.); Kettles; Holden 88'		Bromley 20'; J.Boyle (pen.)	Stadium: Cosmopolitan Park; Referee: Patrick J. Hughes (Kearny)
Note: Celtic: GK Kenworthy, FB Brockey, Miller, HB Hackett, Seddon, Bennett, RW Kettles, Benny Holden, C Hughes, LW Waldron, Reid. Stars: GK Parker, FB Towman, Brown, HB Tier, Jones, F.Boyle, RW McCabe, Murphy, C Bromley, LW J.Boyle, Arnot.

== Second round ==
The second round draw was held on Tuesday April 3 at Evans Hall in Kearny, New Jersey.The games were to be played by April 22.

April 15, 1906	East Newark Celtics	2–2	Scottish American	East Newark, NJ
3:40PM	Kettles 30'; Waldron 80'		Cale 8'; Laurie 75'	Stadium: Cosmopolitan Park; Referee: Allan Montgomery (Newark)
Note: Celtic: GK Kenworthy, FB Seddon, Miller, HB F.Hackett, Reid, Bennett, RW Kettles, Conover, C Hughes, LW Waldron, Brochey. Scottish: GK Saunders, FB Wilson, Rennie, HB A.Purdie, Oschwald, W.Purdie, RW Jamison, Douglas, C Laurie, LW Craig, Cale.

April 21, 1906	O.N.T.	5–4	Bronx Rangers	East Newark, NJ
3:45PM	Saggis 2'; W.McMillan 12'; Young 21' (1H); Stewart 60'		Hunan 20', 70'; R.Martin 26'; Hill 55'	Stadium: Cosmopolitan Park; Referee: Richard Swithenby (Kearny)
Note: O.N.T.: GK Metcalf, LFB Sansom, RFB Murray, LHB A.Burns, CHB Saggis, RHB McKay, LW Watters, LW Charles Young, C Stewart, RW Robert McMillan, RW W.McMillan. Rangers: GK P.Martin, LFB Porter, RFB Harper, LHB Forrest, CHB Hill, RHB Keeler, LW R.Martin LW Ingals, C Hunan, RW McGuler, RW A.Martin.

April 22, 1906	Riverside	2–4	True Blue	East Newark, NJ
1:25PM	L.Fisher 18'; C.Fisher 85'; Holden 88'		Murray (pen.), 89'; Howarth,	Stadium: Cosmopolitan Park; Attendance: 1200; Referee: Patrick J. Hughes (Kearny)T.J.Hughes East Newark
Note: Riverside: GK Kelly, FB Graham, Elchler, HB McGarry, Campbell, Sammy Meeker, RW J.Fisher, Leonard Fisher, C Donohue, LW Charles Fisher, Taylor. True Blue: GK Miller, FB Bobby Taylor, Cochran, HB Smith, Tommy Murray, Beattie, RW John Howarth, Jimmy Oldfield(c), C Spencer, LW Lauder, Turner.

April 22, 1906	West Hudson	5–0	Burns Club	East Newark, NJ
3:55PM	Lone 12'; Miller 51' (1H); Young; Magee			Stadium: Cosmopolitan Park; Attendance: 2000; Referee: William Ritchie (Paterson)
Note: West Hudson: GK Hayes, FB McMahon, Kettles, HB Young, Neil, Lone, RW McClung, Knowles, C McMillan, LW Magee, L.Miller. Burns: GK Thomas Warburton(William Cook), FB Dewar, FB A.Robertson, HB Ronaldson, HB Leonard, HB H.Robertson, RW Taylor, Donaldson, CF Hunter, LW Geddes, Golightly.

=== replay ===
April 29, 1906	Scottish American	1–0	East Newark Celtics	East Newark, NJ
	Laurie 60'			Stadium: Cosmopolitan Park; Attendance: 1800
Note: Celtic: GK Kenworthy, FB Singleton, Miller, HB F.Hackett, Reid, Bennett, RW Kettles, Dowell, C Henn, LW Hughes, Conover. Scottish: GK Saunders, FB Wilson, Rennie, HB Craig, Oschwald, W.Purdie, RW J.Purdie, McNeil, C Laurie, LW Hyslop, Cale.

== Semifinals ==
May 5, 1906	O.N.T.	2–3	True Blue	East Newark, NJ
4:07PM	R.McMillan 33'; Stewart 36'		Murray 8', 13' (pen.)); Oldfield (1H)	Stadium: Cosmopolitan Park; Attendance: 1500; Referee: James Caldwell (New York)
Note: O.N.T.: GK J.Hall, LFB Allen, RFB C.Murray, LHB A.Burns, CHB Saggis, RHB McKay, LW McWatters, LW Charles Young, C Stewart, RW Robert McMillan, RW W.McMillan. True Blue: GK Miller, LFB Bobby Taylor, RFB Corcoran, RHB R.Hall, CHB Tommy Murray, LHB Beattie, RW John Howarth, Jimmy Oldfield(c), C Spencer, LW Lauter, Turner.

May 6, 1906	West Hudson	4–4	Scottish American	East Newark, NJ
3:55PM	Miller 75'; McClung (ET); Young (ET); McMillan (ET)		Hyslop 82'; Laurie (ET) Cale (OT)	Stadium: Cosmopolitan Park; Attendance: 3300; Referee: Earl (Newark)
Note: West Hudson: GK Hayes, FB McMahon, Kettles, HB Young, Donald, Lone, RW McClung, Neil, C McMillan, LW Magee, L.Miller. Scottish: GK Saunders, FB Wilson, Rennie, HB Craig, Oschwald, W.Purdie, RW J.Purdie, McNeil, C Laurie, LW Hyslop, Cale.

=== Charity match ===
On May 13 a benefit game was arranged by the AFA, the proceeds of which would be split between Benjamin Holden of the East Newark Celtics and Thomas Warburton, goalkeeper of the Robert Burns Club. Warburton suffered a broken leg in the April 22nd match against West Hudson. Holden also had his leg broken in a game. The match was set for Cosmopolitan Park in East Newark between the West Hudson squad and a picked eleven from the other AFA teams. The 'All American' team was made up of GK Parker (Kearny Stars), FB Taylor (True Blues), FB Wilson (Scottish American), HB Hackett (East Newark Celtics), HB Hill (Bronx Rangers), HB McKay (O.N.T.), FW Murray (Paterson Rangers), FW Holden (Caledonian), FW Fisher (Riverside), FW Hunter (Burns FC), FW Manner (Paterson Celtic). The West Hudson lineup was GK Hayes, FB McMahon, Donald, HB Young, Neil, Lone, RW Knowles, Tate, C McMillan, LW Magee, Oldfield. James Caldwell of Newark officiated. Before a crowd of 2,200 people West Hudson won 2–0 on goals by Tate and Oldfield.

=== Semifinal replay ===
May 20, 1906	Scottish American	1–3	West Hudson	Newark, NJ
3:55PM	Hyslop 17'		Young 2'; McMillan 22'; Miller 40'	Stadium: Morris Park; Attendance: 4,000; Referee: R. Morrison (Burns Club)
Note: West Hudson: GK Hayes, FB McMahon, Donald, HB Young, Neil, Lone, RW Tate, Knowles, C McMillan, LW Magee, L.Miller. Scottish: GK Sanders, FB Wilson, Rennie, HB A.Purdie, Ross, W.Purdie, RW Laurie, Ochswald, C Craig, LW Hyslop, Jamieson.

== Final ==
The location selected for the final was Morris Park in Newark, New Jersey. After the match ended in a one all draw the AFA met at Evan's Hall in Kearny, NJ and decided that in the replay in case of a tie at full time, extra time would be allowed until one team scored.

May 27, 1906	West Hudson	1–1	True Blue	Newark, NJ
4:21PM	L. Miller 5'		Spencer 43'	Stadium: Morris Park; Attendance: 1,000; Referee: James Caldwell (New York)
Note: West Hudson: GK Hayes, FB McMahon, John Donald(c), HB Young, Neil, Lone, RW Tate, Knowles, C McMillan, LW Magee, Louis Miller. True Blue: GK Robert Miller, FB Bobby Taylor, FB Andy Cochrane, HB Smith, HB Tommy Murray, HB Beattie, RW Dean, Jimmy Oldfield(c), C Spencer, LW Lauder, Turner.

June 2, 1906	True Blue	1–3	West Hudson	Newark, NJ
4:07PM	Spencer 35'		Tate 55', 85'; L.Miller 65'	Stadium: Morris Park; Attendance: 3,500; Referee: James Caldwell (New York)
Note: West Hudson: GK Arthur Hayes, RFB William McMahon, LFB John Donald, LHB John Young, CHB Frank Neil, RHB John Lone, RW John Tate, Thomas Gorman(c), C McMillan, LW John Magee, Louis Miller. True Blue: GK Robert Miller, LFB Bobby Taylor, RFB Andy Cochran, RHB Hall, CHB Tommy Murray, LHB Beattie, RW John Howarth, Jimmy Oldfield(c), C Spencer, LW Lauder, Turner.

== Champions ==

West Hudson 1906. Garnet with light blue trim. New Jersey, Metropolitan, and American Champions.
Top row- Robert M. Marshall, manager; William McMahon, fullback; Arthur Hayes, goal;William McClung, reserve halfback; John Donald, fullback; Toby Singleton, reserve halfback.
Middle row- John Young, halfback; George Bennett, halfback; John Lone, halfback.
Bottom row- Fred Greenhaigh, left wing; George Knowles, left wing; Thomas Gorman(captain), center; John Magee, right wing; Louis Miller, right wing.

== American Cup Bracket ==
First Round
(New Jersey)	Hibernian	3
(New Jersey)	West Hudson	5
(New York (state))	Robert Burns Club	5
(New Jersey)	Caledonian	3
(New Jersey)	East Newark Celtic	0–3
(New Jersey)	Stars	0–2
(New Jersey)	Scottish-Americans
bye
(New Jersey)	Paterson Celtic	4–3
(New Jersey)	Clark O.N.T.	2–10
(New York (state))	Bronx Rangers
bye
(New Jersey)	Riverside
bye
(New Jersey)	Paterson True Blues	4
(New Jersey)	Paterson Rangers	1

Second Round
(New Jersey)	West Hudson	5
(New York (state))	Robert Burns Club	0
(New Jersey)	Eastern Newark Celtic	2–0
(New Jersey)	Scottish-Americans	2–1
(New Jersey)	Clark O.N.T.	5
(New York (state))	Bronx Rangers	4
(New Jersey)	Riverside	2
(New Jersey)	Paterson True Blues	4

Semifinals
(New Jersey)	West Hudson	4–3
(New Jersey)	Scottish-Americans	2–4
(New Jersey)	Clark O.N.T.	2
(New Jersey)	Paterson True Blues	3

Finals
(New Jersey)	West Hudson	1–3
(New Jersey)	Paterson True Blues	1–1

== New England Cup Tie Series ==
There was growing interest in New England for a cup tournament. Randolph Howarth, manager of the Rovers and president of the Inter state league was notified by AFA president Holden of an upcoming meeting regarding the reforming of the American Cup tournament. Pan American manager C.C. Murphy had traveled to Newark and was informed that his team can join the AFA tournament provided seven other clubs join as well. The most that could be secured in short notice were five teams. Mr. Howarth needed more time to round up the remaining teams. A meeting was called for by AFA secretary Herbert Turner to inform the New England representatives of the rules, regulations and by-laws of the organization. The meeting was scheduled for 8PM on Thursday March 8 at the rooms of the City Football league on Quequechan street in Fall River. However word was received late Thursday afternoon that the AFA met on Wednesday and decided because it was too late in the season, they would continue without the New England teams as they were beginning the first round a few days later on March 11. It was then decided by the members of the Fall River meeting to continue to conduct a tournament apart from the AFA and call themselves the New England Association Cup-Tie League. The officers elected were William Allan of Pawtucket as president, Nat Frazer of Boston as vice-president, Randolph Howarth of Fall River as secretary, and C.C. Murphy Jr. of Fall River as treasurer.

== Participants ==
There were eleven entries for this tournament. Fairlawn was originally drawn in the ties however they failed to pay the entry fee by the due date and were replaced by Taunton.

- ~~Fairlawn – Pawtucket, RI~~
- Fore River – Quincy, MA (Merrimac Valley League)
- Gorhams – Providence, RI (RI Football League)
- Howard & Bullough – Pawtucket, RI (Inter State League/RI Football League)
- J&P Coats – Pawtucket, RI (Inter State League/RI Football League)
- Lindsay Athletics – Pawtucket, RI
- Lynn – Quincy, MA (Merrimac Valley League)
- Pan Americans – Fall River, MA (Inter State League)
- Rovers – Thornton, RI
- Rovers – Fall River, MA (Inter State League)
- Taunton – Massachusetts
- Westerly – Rhode Island

== First round ==
The first round was due to be completed by March 31. The Pan Americans originally drawn with Fairlawn had a bye when they were scratched. The Thornton Rangers who originally drew the bye were paired with Taunton when they entered.

Pan Americans	w/o	Fairlawn

March 24, 1906	Rovers	11–2	Gorhams	Fall River, MA
				Stadium: Athletic grounds Referee: Eccleson (New Bedford)

March 31, 1906	J&P Coats	2–1	Lynn	Pawtucket, RI
				Referee: Robert Pickup (Fall River)

March 31, 1906	Lindsay	1–3	Fore River	Pawtucket, RI
				Referee: William Moss (Fall River)

April 7, 1906	Howard & Bullough	4–1	Westerly	Pawtucket, RI
				Stadium: Sabin street grounds Referee: William Moss (Fall River)

Thornton	2–1	Taunton	Thornton, RI
			Referee: Bruxby (Pawtucket)

== Second round ==
The second round draw was held April 2, 1906 in Pawtucket, Rhode Island. H&B and Thornton drew byes.

April 7, 1906	Rovers	1–2	Pan Americans	Fall River, MA
				Stadium: Athletic grounds Attendance: 1500; Referee: Eccleston (New Bedford)

April 14, 1906	J&P Coats	4–2	Fore River	Pawtucket, RI
3:30PM				Stadium: Lonsdale ave grounds Referee: Eccles

== Semifinals ==
April 14, 1906	Thornton	2–3	Pan Americans	Thornton, RI
				Referee: Eccleston

April 28, 1906	Howard & Bullough	0–0	J&P Coats	Pawtucket, RI
				Stadium: Sabin street grounds Referee: Moss

May 5, 1906	Howard & Bullough	3–0	J&P Coats	Pawtucket, RI
				Stadium: Lonsdale ave grounds Referee: Eccles

== Final ==
May 26, 1906	Howard & Bullough	2–2	Pan Americans	Pawtucket, RI
				Stadium: Lonsdale ave grounds Attendance: 2395; Referee: Pemberton

June 2, 1906	Pan Americans	3–0	Howard & Bullough	Fall River, MA
				Stadium: Athletic grounds Referee: Gordon

== New England Cup Bracket ==
First Round
(Rhode Island)	Howard & Bullough	4
(Rhode Island)	Westerly	1
(Rhode Island)	J&P Coats	2
(Massachusetts)	Lynn	1
(Massachusetts)	Fore River	3
Lindsay	1
(Rhode Island)	Thornton Rovers	2
(Massachusetts)	Taunton	1
(Massachusetts)	Fall River Rovers	11
(Rhode Island)	Gorhams	2
(Massachusetts)	Pan Americans	w/o
(Rhode Island)	~~Fairlawn~~

Second Round
(Rhode Island)	Howard & Bullough
bye
(Rhode Island)	J&P Coats	4
(Massachusetts)	Fore River	2
(Rhode Island)	Thornton Rovers
bye
(Massachusetts)	Fall River Rovers	1
(Massachusetts)	Pan Americans	2

Semifinals
(Rhode Island)	Howard & Bullough	3
(Rhode Island)	J&P Coats	0
(Rhode Island)	Thornton Rovers	2
(Massachusetts)	Pan Americans	3

Finals
(Rhode Island)	Howard & Bullough	2–0
(Massachusetts)	Pan Americans	2–3

== See also ==
1905–06 Haverford Fords men's soccer team
