= Harrison Alley Boys =

Alley Boys F.C., better known as the Harrison Alley Boys, was a U.S. soccer team of the early twentieth century. It spent one season in the National Association Football League, winning the 1915-1916 championship.

== History ==
The Alley Boys played in Harrison, New Jersey an early hot bed of U.S. soccer. They were an established team by 1908 and played in the Inter-city Soccer Football League becoming champions in 1912-13. In 1914, they went to the third round of the National Challenge Cup and finished the season undefeated in the New Jersey State Amateur football league with a record of 22-0-0. In 1915, the Alley Boys joined the National Association Football League. The New York Times wrote regarding a victory over Brooklyn F.C. early in the season, “the victory was especially popular because the Alley Boys team is made up of native American players.” That season, they won the NAFBL championship, but withdrew from the league during the off season. The team remained active through 1917 when they defeated Fulton A.C. in the second round of the National Challenge Cup in November.

== Year-by-year ==
Year	League	Reg. season	American Cup	National Challenge Cup
1912-1913	ISFL	1st	First Round	N/A
1913/14	NJSA	1st	Preliminary	Third round
1915/16	NAFBL	1st	First round	?
1916/17	?	?	Second Round	?

== Honors ==
League Championship

- Winner (1): 1915
