= 1916–17 National Association Foot Ball League season =

National Association Foot Ball League
- Season: 1916–17
- Champion(s): Jersey A.C. (2nd title)
- Matches: 39

Statistics of National Association Foot Ball League in season 1916-17.

Before the season, Dublin, New York, and Newark were added. Brooklyn F. C. disbanded after their first game and were replaced by Splitsdorf F. C. who disbanded before playing their first game.

After the season, Dublin, and Newark withdrew.

== League standings ==
| Position | Team | Pts | Pld | W | L | T |
|---|---|---|---|---|---|---|
| 1 | Jersey A.C. | 19 | 12 | 8 | 1 | 3 |
| 2 | Kearny Scots | 16 | 12 | 7 | 3 | 2 |
| 3 | Bayonne Babcock & Wilcox | 14 | 11 | 7 | 4 | 0 |
| 4 | New York F.C. | 12 | 11 | 4 | 3 | 4 |
| 5 | West Hudson A.A. | 7 | 12 | 1 | 6 | 5 |
| 6 | Dublin F.C. (Paterson) | 5 | 10 | 2 | 7 | 1 |
| 7 | Newark Ironsides] | 4 | 9 | 1 | 6 | 2 |
| 8 | Brooklyn F.C. | 0 | 1 | 0 | 1 | 0 |
| 9 | Splitdorf F.C. | 0 | 0 | 0 | 0 | 0 |
