= 1897–98 National Association Foot Ball League season =

National Association Foot Ball League
- Season: 1897-98
- Champion(s): Paterson True Blues (1st title)
- Matches: 48

The fourth season of the National Association Foot Ball League began on Saturday, October 30, 1897 after eight major teams New York City and in New Jersey had "sunk all their differences" and agreed to put the NAFBL on a firm financial basis. Among the new features was that the matches would be scheduled "so that teams which cannot play on Saturdays will be allowed to play on Sundays, and vice-versa." The original lineup featured the New Jersey teams of Americus A.A. (West Hoboken); Centreville A.C. (Bayonne); the Scottish-Americans of Newark; the Kearny Scots of the Newark suburb of Kearny, New Jersey; the True Blues and the Crescents (both of Paterson); and Arlington A.A., with the Brooklyn Wanderers as the New York team.

A schedule was released on October 23, with the first weeks games featuring the Paterson Crescents visiting the Kearny Scots and Arlington at the Paterson True Blues on Saturday. Americus visited Centreville at Bayonne and Brooklyn visited the Scottish Americans at Newark on Sunday.

== League standings ==
Position	Team	Pts	Pld	W	L	T
1	Paterson True Blues	23	13	11	1	1
2	Kearny Scots	22	14	10	2	2
3	Kearny Arlington	18	15	8	5	2
4	Bayonne Centerville	17	13	8	4	1
5	Kearny AC	13	13	6	6	1
6	Brooklyn Wanderers	12	14	6	8	0
7	Paterson Crescent	4	13	2	11	0

== See also ==
- 1898 American Cup
