= 1908–09 National Association Foot Ball League season =

National Association Foot Ball League
- Season: 1908–09
- Champion(s): East Newark Clark A.A. (1st title,Co-Champion); West Hudson A.A. (2nd title,Co-Champion)
- Matches: 29

Statistics of National Association Foot Ball League in season 1908–09.

East Newark Clark A.A. and West Hudson A.A. were declared league co-champions. After the season, East Newark Clark A.A. withdrew.

== League standings ==
Pos.	Team	Pts	Pld	W	L	T
1	East Newark Clark A.A.	18	10	9	1	0
1	West Hudson A.A.	18	10	9	1	0
2	Paterson True Blues	9	10	4	5	1
3	Newark F.C.	5	9	2	6	1
4	Kearny Scots	5	9	1	5	3
5	Paterson Rangers	3	9	1	7	1
