= 1917–18 National Association Foot Ball League season =

National Association Foot Ball League
- Season: 1917–18
- Champion(s): Paterson F.C. (1st title)
- Matches: 30

Statistics of National Association Foot Ball League in season 1917-18.

Before the season, Bethlehem Steel, Paterson and Tacony were added. After the season, West Hudson, Kearny, Tacony, and Jersey withdrew.

== League standings ==
National Association Foot Ball League Season 1917-18
Position	Team	GP	W	L	T	Pts
1	Paterson F.C.	14	12	1	1	25
2	Bethlehem Steel	14	11	2	1	23
3	West Hudson A.A.	14	7	6	1	15
4	Kearny Scots	14	6	6	2	14
5	Tacony (PA) Disston A.A.	14	5	7	2	12
6	Bayonne Babcock & Wilcox	14	4	7	3	11
7	New York F.C.	14	4	7	3	11
8	Jersey A.C.	14	0	13	1	1
