= 1911–12 National Association Foot Ball League season =

National Association Foot Ball League
- Season: 1911–12
- Champion(s): West Hudson A.A. (4th title)
- Matches: 48

Statistics of National Association Foot Ball League in season 1911–12.

Before the season, Bronx United was added.

== League standings ==
Position	Team	Pts	Pld	W	L	T
1	West Hudson A.A.	20	13	9	2	2
2	Paterson Wilberforce	16	12	6	2	4
3	Paterson True Blues	13	11	5	3	3
4	Paterson Rangers	13	12	5	4	3
5	Jersey A.C.	11	14	4	6	3
6	Brooklyn F.C.	10	11	4	5	2
7	Bronx United	8	11	2	5	4
8	Kearny Scots	5	12	2	9	1
