= 1912–13 National Association Foot Ball League season =

National Association Foot Ball League
- Season: 1912–13
- Champion(s): West Hudson A.A. (5th title)
- Matches: 86

Statistics of National Association Foot Ball League in season 1912–13.

Before the season, Newark Caledonians were added. Newark F.C. replaced Brooklyn Wanderers, which disbanded and merged into Brooklyn F.C. on 12/23/1912 after 6 games.

== League standings ==
Position	Team	Pts	Pld	W	L	T
1	West Hudson A.A.	28	18	13	3	2
2	Paterson True Blues	29	19	13	3	3
3	Paterson Wilberforce	27	19	2	4	3
4	Jersey A.C.	23	18	10	5	3
5	Kearny Scots	16	17	7	8	2
6	Newark Caledonians	15	18	6	9	3
7	Bronx United	14	17	7	10	0
8	Paterson Rangers	12	17	5	10	2
9	Newark F.C.	8	13	3	8	2
10	Brooklyn F.C.	4	16	2	14	0
