= 1914–15 National Association Foot Ball League season =

National Association Foot Ball League
- Season: 1914–15
- Champion(s): West Hudson A.A. (6th title)
- Matches: 68

Statistics of National Association Foot Ball League in season 1914-15.

Newark Caledonians withdrew before the start of the season. After the season, Bronx United, Paterson Rangers, Paterson True Blues and Newark F.C. withdrew.

== League standings ==
Position	Team	Pts	Pld	W	L	T
1	West Hudson A.A.	28	16	14	2	0
2	Jersey A.C.	27	16	13	2	1
3	Kearny Scots	21	16	8	3	5
4	Bronx United	14	14	7	7	0
5	New York Clan MacDonald	14	14	5	5	4
6	Brooklyn F.C.	13	14	5	6	3
7	Paterson Rangers	12	14	4	6	4
8	Newark F.C.	5	16	2	13	1
9	Paterson True Blues	2	16	0	14	2
