= 1909–10 National Association Foot Ball League season =

National Association Foot Ball League
- Season: 1909–10
- Champion(s): West Hudson A.A. (3rd title)
- Matches: 41

Statistics of National Association Foot Ball League in season 1909-10.

Before the season, Paterson Wilberforce, Jersey F.C. and Brooklyn F.C. were added. Newark withdrew during the season and was replaced by Bronx United who withdrew at the end of the season.

== League standings ==
| Position | Team | Pts | Pld | W | L | T |
|---|---|---|---|---|---|---|
| 1 | West Hudson A.A. | 20 | 10 | 10 | 0 | 0 |
| 2 | Jersey A.C. | 18 | 13 | 9 | 4 | 0 |
| 3 | Brooklyn F.C. | 11 | 10 | 9 | 4 | 1 |
| 4 | Kearny Scots | 10 | 12 | 4 | 6 | 2 |
| 5 | Paterson True Blues | 8 | 10 | 4 | 6 | 0 |
| 6 | Newark F.C. | 8 | 10 | 3 | 5 | 2 |
| 7 | Paterson Rangers | 6 | 10 | 2 | 6 | 2 |
| 8 | Paterson Wilberforce | 1 | 7 | 0 | 6 | 1 |
