= West New York Burns Club =

- Stadium: New York
- League: National Association Football League

The West New York Burns Club were a professional soccer club from New York which played in the National Association Football League. They played in the 1906/1907 season when the NASL reformed after a 7 year hiatus. They would only play that season professionally before reverting to amateur status. They won 8 games, lost 8 games, and drew none, finishing 7th in the league.
