= 1909–10 Eastern Professional Soccer League I season =

Soccer league season

The statistics of the Eastern Professional Soccer League for the 1909-10 season. Weather and scheduling problems caused the league to be suspended. The league folded before the beginning of the second season.

== League standings ==
Place	Team	GP	W	L	T	GF	GA	Points
1	Fall River Rovers	7	4	0	3	23	8	11
2	Howard & Bullough F.C.	5	3	1	1	8	9	7
3	West Hudsons	5	2	2	1	5	5	5
4	Philadelphia Hibernians	5	1	1	3	7	8	5
5	Philadelphia Thistles	5	1	3	1	6	12	3
6	Newark F.C.	5	0	1	4	7	17	1
