= 1914–15 National Challenge Cup =

American soccer tournament season

- Dewar Challenge Cup

Tournament details
- Country: United States
- Teams: 64

Final positions
- Champions: Bethlehem (1st title)
- Runners-up: Brooklyn Celtic

Tournament statistics
- Matches played: 69
- Goals scored: 244 (3.54 per match)

The 1914–15 National Challenge Cup was the second tournament of the modern-day Lamar Hunt U.S. Open Cup. Many more teams - 80 - competed in 1915 after the success of the 1913–14 tournament. St. Louis and California were the only major soccer-playing regions without a representative. Bethlehem won the tournament.

== Bracket ==
Home teams listed on top of bracket

Third Round; February 13,20,21, 1915
PA	Homestead F.C.	5
OH	Cleveland Thistles	0
IL	Pullman F.C.	2
MI	Packard F.C.	1
PA	Bethlehem	1
PA	Victor F.C.	0
NJ	Scottish American FC	3
NY	Hudson United F.C.	1
CT	Ansonia F.C.	2
RI	J&P Coats	4
MA	New Bedford F.C.	0
MA	Fore River	1
NY	Brooklyn Celtic	3
NJ	Paterson Rangers	0
NY	Bronx United	0
NY	Continentals F.C.	2

Quarterfinals; March 20,21, 1915
PA	Homestead F.C.	2
IL	Pullman F.C.	1
PA	Bethlehem	3
NJ	Scottish American FC	1
RI	J&P Coats	1
MA	Fore River	0
NY	Brooklyn Celtic	4
NY	Continentals F.C.	2

Semifinals; April 5,10, 1915
PA	Homestead F.C.	1
PA	Bethlehem	4
NY	Brooklyn Celtic	2
RI	J&P Coats	1

Final; May 3, 1915
PA	Bethlehem	3
NY	Brooklyn Celtic	1

== Final ==
May 3, 1915

Bethlehem (PA)	3–1	Brooklyn Celtic (NY)
Millar; Fleming (pen.); Ford	Report	McQueen

Taylor Field, Bethlehem, Pennsylvania
Attendance: 7,500
Referee: Charles Lambie (USA)
- (Scotland) Bill Duncan
- (Scotland) Bob Morrison
- (United States) Thomas Murray
- (England) Fred Pepper
- (Scotland) James Campbell
- (United States) Jock Ferguson
- (England) Sam Fletcher
- (United States) Neil Clarke
- (United States) Robert Millar (c)
- (United States) James Ford
- (Scotland) Tommy Fleming
- Manager: Horace Lewis
- (England) Frank Mather
- Nicholas
- Harry McWilliams
- John Broadbent
- Donegan
- Neville
- (Ireland) Thomas Campion
- (England) Albert Lonie
- (Ireland) Roddy O'Halloran (c)
- John McQueen
- Thomas McGreevey
- Manager: Thomas McCamphill

== See also ==
- 1915 American Cup

== Sources ==
- USOpenCup.com
- New York Times
