= 1912–13 American Cup =

Soccer tournament

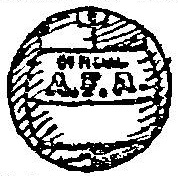

Tournament details
- Country: United States
- Dates: October 1912 – April 1913
- Teams: 33

Final positions
- Champions: True Blue (3rd title)
- Runners-up: Tacony

The 1912–13 American Cup was the annual challenge cup held by the American Football Association. This marked the twelfth time a New Jersey team won the tournament and the third time for this year's winner the Paterson True Blues. It took three matches for them to overcome their final opponents Tacony of Philadelphia aka the 'Tacks'. Another notable encounter between New Jersey teams was a four game duel between Newark Caledonians and the Paterson Rangers in the second round. They battled to 0-0, 2-2, and 1-1 draws before the Caledonians surpassed the Rangers 1-0 in the fourth game.

== Preliminary round ==
The draw was held September 14, 1912 at the Continental hotel in Newark, NJ. The 33 teams were divided up into Pennsylvania, New England, and New York/New Jersey districts.
New England District

October 19, 1912

Rovers	3–1	Woonsocket
15' Louis Gauthier; 62' J.J. Sullivan; 65' McKenna		85' Sellers

Athletic grounds, Fall River, MA
Attendance: 200
Referee: Moore (Pawtucket)

Pennsylvania District – No games

New York/New Jersey District – No games

== First round ==
The all Rover match between Fall River and Fore River was ordered replayed due to the game being played with only 40 minute halves instead of 45. The second match was also protested and had to be replayed because the grounds at Quincy were not enclosed. The Olympic–True Blue match was replayed because they both wore very similar style and color of uniforms. As the home team, the True Blue squad was obligated to don an alternate kit in this situation.
New England District

October 20, 1912

Thistle	0–7	Howard & Bullough
		Harvey; McAuliffe; Long (2); Haigh (3)

Seabreeze Park, Bridgeport, CT
Referee: McCauley (Ansonia)
October 26, 1912

Rovers	5–2	Fore River Rovers
7' Sullivan; 9' Louis Gauthier; 70' McKenna; 87' Sullivan		5' Harrison; 80' Caruthers

Athletic grounds, Fall River, MA
Referee: Moore (Pawtucket)
October 26, 1912

Presbyterian	0–9	Bridgeport

Newfield Park, Bridgeport, CT
Attendance: Mr. Booth
October 26, 1912

Ansonia	2–4	Farr & Alpaca
1H' Austin; 2H' Austin		10' Dowdall; 22' Hall; J. Moodie; 80' Cruickshanks

League Park, Ansonia, CT
Attendance: 500
Referee: Milne (New Haven)

replays

November 16, 1912

Fore River Rovers	6–0	Rovers
Shaw (5); Harrison

Ward Three grounds, Quincy, MA
Attendance: 400
Referee: Nicholas Eccels (Fall River)
November 30, 1912

Rovers	4–3	Fore River Rovers
12' Oldham; McKenna; J.J.Sullivan (pk); 67' Louis Gauthier		2' Shaw; Shaw (pk); Shaw

Athletic grounds, Fall River, MA
Referee: Smith

Pennsylvania District

October 26, 1912

Thistles	1–0	Tennyson
Radcliffe

Washington Park, Philadelphia, PA
Referee: James Walder
October 26, 1912

Collingwood	3–2	Victor
Liggitt (3)		Brigham; Swartz

Philadelphia, PA
Referee: S.H. Williams (Trenton)
October 26, 1912

Wissinoming	0–2	Tacony
		50' Plant; Miller

Philadelphia, PA
Referee: George Young
October 26, 1912

Hibernian	w/o	Bethlehem

Philadelphia, PA

New York/New Jersey District

October 20, 1912

Haledon Thistle	3–6	Schenectady
Pedin; Bernasconi; Walder		Hutton (2); Carstairs (2); Ferguson; Barron

Olympic Park
Referee: Ben Holden
October 27, 1912

West Hudson	2–1	Brooklyn
1' Knowles; Lennox (pk)		85' Coward

Harrison Oval
Referee: D. White
October 27, 1912

Caledonian	2–0	Robert Burns
20' Hogan; 30' Denby

Wiedenmayer's Park
October 27, 1912

Wanderers	1–1	Scottish Americans
Edholm		Gardner

Suburban Oval, Brooklyn
Referee: J. Nesbitt
October 27, 1912

Jersey A.C.	6–0	Alley Boys

Jersey City, NJ
October 27, 1912

Bronx United	1–1	Rangers
15' Black		75' Fenwick

Bronx Oval
Referee: Andrew Laurie
October 27, 1912

True Blue	2–1	Olympics
32' Tommy Conlon; 80' Charley Fisher (pk)		25' Hagan

Willard Park
Referee: Charley Ward
October 27, 1912

Wilberforce	6–2	Carlton Hill
1H'; 65' Johnny Young; 83' Monteeth; Garside; Monteeth; 85' Gilmore		McQuinn; Parks (pk)

Olympic Park
Referee: Burnside

replays

November 3, 1912

Scottish American	4–1	Wanderers
30' Grant; Richardson (2); Gardner		McKenna

Harrison Oval
Referee: J. Nesbit
November 3, 1912

Rangers	2–1	Bronx United
Johnson; Coupar		Loney

Olympic Park
Referee: Laurie
November 10, 1912

Olympics	0–4	True Blue
		31' Bradwell; 60' Conlon; 70' Clarke; 85' Ford

Willard Park
Referee: Charley Ward (Passaic)

== Second round ==
New England District

November 23, 1912

Farr & Alpaca	1–3	Bridgeport
7' Cruickshanks		60' Stamford; 65' Butterworth; 70' Robinson

Berkshire street grounds, Holyoke, MA
Referee: J. Milne (New Haven)
December 14, 1912

Rovers	2–0	Howard & Bullough
7' Jack Sullivan; 60' Mike Sullivan

Athletic grounds, Fall River, MA
Attendance: 1500
Referee: Moore (Pawtucket)

Pennsylvania District

November 30, 1912

Hibernian	6–1	Collingwood
McNichol (4); Swords; Blaney (pk)		Liggitt

Philadelphia, PA
Referee: James Kerr
November 30, 1912

Tacony	0–0	Thistles

Tacony Ball Park
Referee: George Young

replay

December 7, 1912

Thistles	1–4	Tacony
McMillan		Miller; Bobby Morrison; Coyle; Plant

Washington Park
Referee: George Young

New York/New Jersey District

November 24, 1912

Jersey A.C.	2–1	Schenectady
Hayes; 88' Hayes		Cook (pk)

West Side Park, Jersey City, NJ
Referee: Andrew Laurie
November 24, 1912

Scottish American	1–4	True Blue
89' Richardson		10' Neilson; 60' Ford; Ford; Neilson

West Hudson Oval, Harrison, NJ
Referee: Alexander Burnside
December 1, 1912

Wilberforce	2–2	West Hudson
55' Leadbeater; 87' Leadbeater		Cooper; 80' Knowles

Willard Park, Paterson, NJ
Attendance: 2000
Referee: Nesbit (Brooklyn)
December 1, 1912

Caledonian	0–0	Rangers

Wiedenmayer's Park, Newark, NJ
Referee: Montgomery

replays

December 8, 1912

West Hudson	4–1	Wilberforce
3' McHolland; Lennox; Carter; Knowles		75' Monteith

West Hudson Oval, Harrison, NJ
Attendance: 1000
Referee: John Nesbitt (Brooklyn)
December 8, 1912

Rangers	2–2	Caledonian
67' Cooper; 80' Fenwick		20' Ingraham; 42' Eikens

Olympic Park, Paterson, NJ
Referee: Allen Montgomery
December 15, 1912

Caledonian	1–1	Rangers
Hogan		50' Reilly

West Hudson Oval, Harrison, NJ
Referee: Allen Montgomery
December 22, 1912

Rangers	0–1	Caledonian
		25' Albin

Willard Park, Paterson, NJ
Referee: Allen Montgomery

== Third round ==
December 28, 1912

Hibernian	4–0	Caledonian
Gallagher (2); McNichol; Gaynor

Philadelphia, PA
Referee: James Walders (Philadelphia)
December 29, 1912

Bridgeport	0–2	True Blue
		55' Conlon; Clarke

Seabreeze Park, Bridgeport, CT
Attendance: 500
January 5, 1913

Jersey AC	0–1	Tacony
		88' Miller

Jersey City, NJ
Referee: Charles Ward (Passaic)
January 11, 1913

Fall River	3–0	West Hudson
25' McLane; 35' J. Sullivan; 55' Greenslade

Fall River, MA
Attendance: 2000
Referee: Wilkinson (Connecticut)

== Semifinal ==
March 15, 1913

Fall River	0–3	True Blue
		42', 70' Neilson; Wilson (pk)

Bedford Street grounds
Attendance: 3000
Referee: Alex Milne (New Haven)
March 15, 1913

Tacony	2–1	Hibernian
46' Owens; 71' Owens		34' Gaynor

Tacony Ball Park
Referee: Allen Montgomery (Newark)

== Final ==
April 12, 1913

Tacony	2–2	True Blue
8' Morrison; 32' Owens		70' Neil Clarke; 87' Jackie Neilson

Philadelphia, Pennsylvania
Attendance: 1,500
Referee: Alexander Burnside (Brooklyn)

=== First replay ===
April 19, 1913

Tacony	1–1	True Blue
60' Bob Millar (pk)		89’ Neil Clarke

Philadelphia, Pennsylvania
Attendance: 3,300
Referee: Alexander Burnside

=== Second replay ===
April 27, 1913

True Blue	2–1	Tacony
48' Alec Lowe; 52' Jack Nielson (pk)		7' George Kemp

Morris Park, Newark
Attendance: 5,000
Referee: Alexander Burnside

Lineups:
Paterson- Esplin, Wilson(c), Murray, Forfar, Clark, Hudson, Ford, Lowe, Lynch, Gradwell, Neilson.
Tacony- Ness, Small, McKelvey, Kennedy, Morrison(c), Richardson, Alexander, Kemp, Owens, Miller, Andrews.

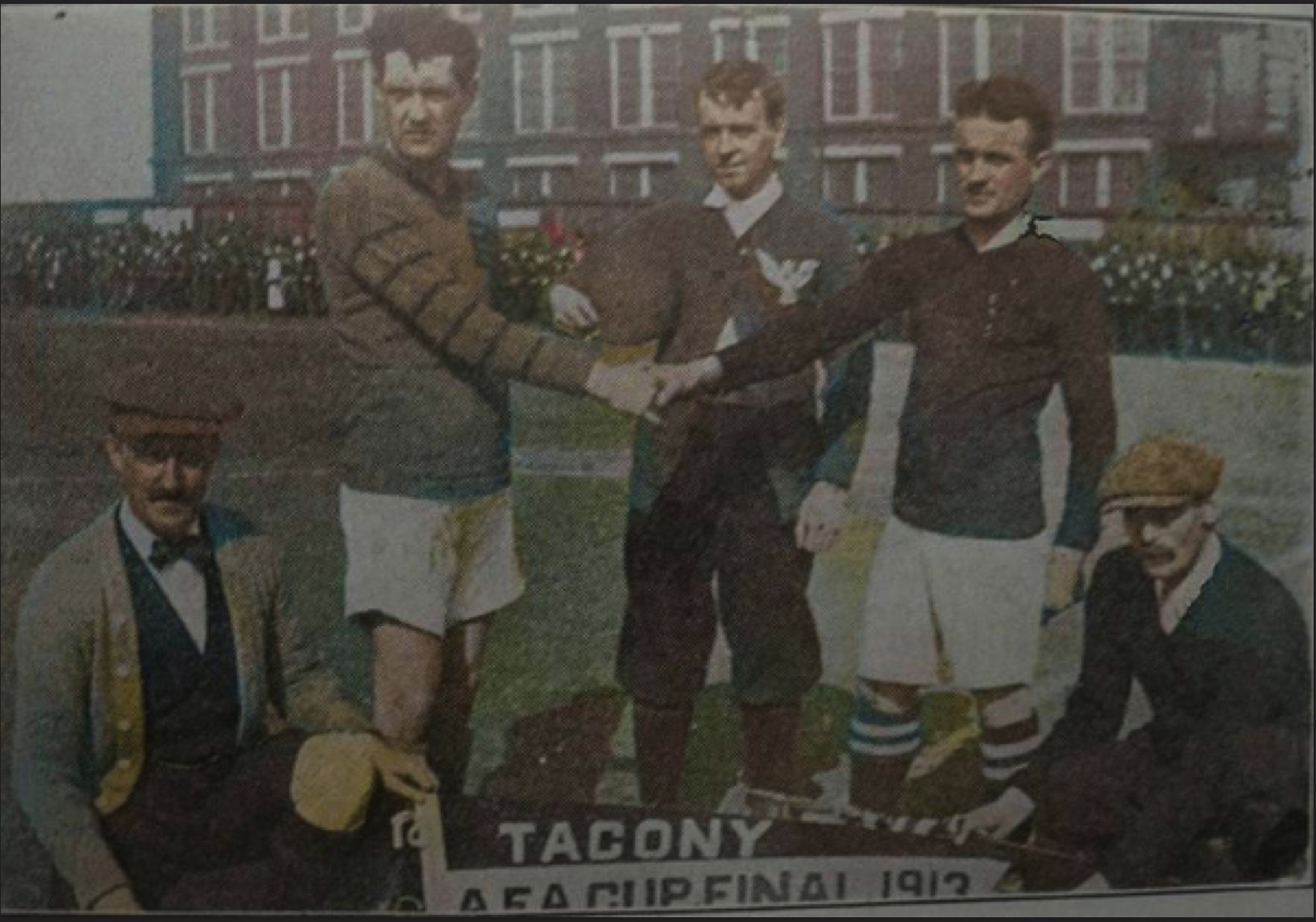
American Cup final in Philadelphia on April 19, 1913. Pictured from left to right: Linesman Addison, True Blues captain Wilson, Referee Burnside, Tacony captain Robert Morrison, and Linesman Bishop.

== Champions ==

True Blue Football Club 1913. National League runner–up and American Cup Champions.
Back row: De Blyker (trainer), Wilson, Forfar, Clark, Hall (manager), Esplein, Murray, Hudson, Garside (trainer).
Front row: Ford, Lowe, Lynch, Gradwell, Neilson.

== See also ==
- 1913 American Amateur Football Association Cup
- 1912–13 St. Louis Soccer League season
- 1912–13 National Association Foot Ball League season
