= National Association Football League =

Semi-professional U.S. soccer league

- Founded: 1895
- First season: 1895
- Folded: 1921; 105 years ago
- Country: United States
- Number of clubs: 36
- Level on pyramid: 1
- Most championships: West Hudson A.A. (6)

The National Association Football League (also spelled National Association Foot Ball League) (NAFBL) was a semi-professional U.S. soccer league which operated between 1895 and 1898. The league was reconstituted in 1906 and continued to operate until 1921.

== History ==
The NAFBL was formed in January 1895 and in March 1895, the NAFBL began operation as the third significant U.S. soccer league. It drew its teams primarily from northern New Jersey and New York City. Few records exist for the league, but the teams and standings for four of the five seasons do exist. After its first spring-summer season in 1895, the NAFBL moved to a winter schedule in the fall of 1895.

On December 16, 1895, the NAFBL opened its second season with a game pitting the Kearny Scottish-Americans and the International Athletic Club. In 1899, a deep recession, accompanied by the Spanish–American War led to the collapse of several athletic leagues and teams, among them the NAFBL. On August 14, 1906, the league was revived and continued in operation until 1921. That year, several of the top NAFBL teams, frustrated by the amateur/semi-professional nature of the league, joined with other top North Atlantic U.S. teams to form the first fully professional U.S. soccer league, the American Soccer League.

== 1895–1899 ==
=== Teams ===
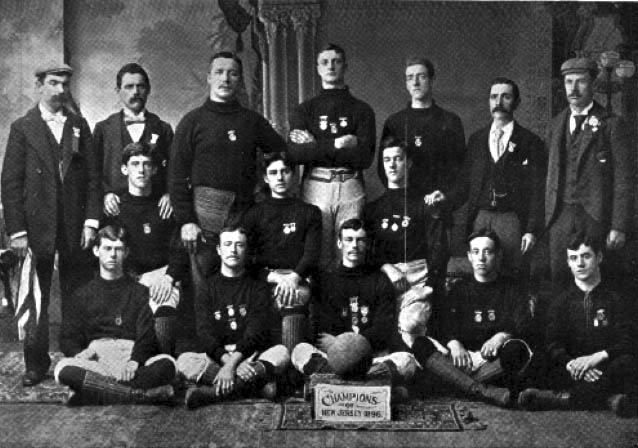
Kearny Athletics team of 1896

- Americus A. A. (1895)
- Bayonne Bayside (1898–1899)
- Brooklyn Wanderers (1895–1899)
- Centreville A.C. (1895–1899)
- International A.C. (1895–1896)
- Kearny AC (1897–1898)
- Kearny Arlington (1897–1899)
- Kearny Cedars (1898–1899)
- Kearny Scots (1895–1899)
- Newark Caledonians (1895–1896)
- New York Thistle (1895–1896)
- Paterson Crescent (1897–1898)
- Paterson True Blues (1897–1988)

== 1906–1921 ==
=== Teams ===
- Babcock & Wilcox (1915–1919, 1920–1921)
- Bethlehem Steel F.C. (1917–1921)
- Bronx United (1910–1915)
- Brooklyn Field Club (1909–1916)
- Brooklyn Morse Dry Dock (1919–1920)
- Brooklyn Robins Dry Dock (1918–1921)
- Bunker Hill F.C. (1920)
- Dublin F.C. (1916–1917)
- Clark A.A. (East Newark Clark A.A.) (1906–1907, 1908–1909)
- Essex County F.C. (1906–1907)
- Gorden Rangers (1906)
- Haledon Thistles (1915–1916)
- Harrison Alley Boys (1915–1916)
- Hollywood Inn F.C. (1907–1908)
- Jersey A.C. (1907–1908, 1909–1918)
- Kearny A.C. (1906–1907)
- Erie A.A. (1919–1921)
- Kearny Scots (Scots-Americans or Scottish-Americans) (1906–1918)
- Kearny Federal Ship (1919–1921)
- Kearny Stars (1906–1907)
- Newark Caledonians (1912–1914)
- Newark FC (1906–1911, 1912–1915)
- Newark Hearts (1906–1908)
- Newark Ironsides (1916–1917)
- New York Clan MacDonald (1907–1908, 1913–1915)
- New York F.C. (1916–1921)
- New York IRT (1919)
- Paterson F.C. (1917–1920)
- Paterson Rangers (1906–1915)
- Paterson True Blues (1906–1915)
- Paterson Wilberforce (1909–1914)
- Disston A.A. (Tacony Disston or Philadelphia Disston) (1917–1918, 1919–1921)
- Philadelphia Merchant Ship (1918–1920)
- St. George F.C. (1913–1914)
- West Hudson A.A. (1906–1907, 1908–1918)
- West New York Burns Club (1906–1907)

== Champions ==
Ed.	Year	Winner	Runners-up
1	1895	Centreville A.C. (1)	Kearny Scots
2	1895–96	(no records about this season)	
3	1896–97	Scottish Americans (1)	Brooklyn Wanderers
4	1897–98	Paterson True Blues (1)	Kearny Scots
5	1898–99	Paterson True Blues (2)	Kearny Arlington
–	(no championships held 1899–1906)		
6	1906–07	West Hudson A.A. (1)	Kearny Scots
7	1907–08	Newark F.C. (1)	Paterson Rangers
8	1908–09	East Newark Clark A.A. (1) (Note: As Clark and West Hudson finished tied, both were declared co-champions.)	Paterson True Blues
8	1908–09	West Hudson A.A. (2)	Paterson True Blues
9	1909–10	West Hudson A.A. (3)	Jersey A.C.
10	1910–11	Jersey A.C. (1)	Paterson Wilberforce
11	1911–12	West Hudson A.A. (4)	Paterson Wilberforce
12	1912–13	West Hudson A.A. (5)	Paterson True Blues
13	1913–14	Brooklyn F.C. (1)	West Hudson A.A.
14	1914–15	West Hudson A.A. (6)	Jersey A.C.
15	1915–16	Harrison Alley Boys (1)	Kearny Scots
16	1916–17	Jersey A.C. (2)	Kearny Scots
17	1917–18	Paterson F.C. (1)	Bethlehem Steel F.C.
18	1918–19	Bethlehem Steel F.C. (1)	Philadelphia Merchant Ship
19	1919–20	Bethlehem Steel F.C. (2)	Erie A.A.
20	1920–21	Bethlehem Steel F.C. (3)	New York F.C.
