= 1914–15 American Cup =

American football tournament

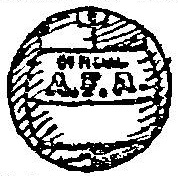

Tournament details
- Country: United States
- Dates: October 1914 – April 1915
- Teams: 41

Final positions
- Champions: Scottish American (1st title)
- Runners-up: Brooklyn Celtic

The 1914–15 American Cup was the annual challenge cup held by the American Football Association. Forty-one teams entered the tournament. The Scottish-Americans, after two previous final appearances, won their first American Cup by overcoming the Brooklyn Celtics 1-0 in the championship game.

== Preliminary round ==
The draw for the preliminary and first rounds was held September 12, 1914 at the Continental hotel in Newark, NJ. The Preliminary round was to be played by October 16 and the First round by October 31.

New Jersey District

October 10, 1914

Haledon Thistle	0–0	Olympic

Willard Park, Paterson, NJ
Referee: Allan Montgomery
October 18, 1914

Babcock & Wilcox	3–1	Riordan
30', 55' H. Smith; Bert Holden		35' Mardsley

Bayonne, NJ
Referee: John Wilson

replay

October 17, 1914

Olympic	6–0	Haledon Thistle
15' Charlie O'Neil; Bob McHugh (5)

Willard Park, Paterson, NJ
Referee: Alan Montgomery

== First round ==
The Victor football club of Philadelphia had a first round bye. The Greenville Sporting and Soccer club had to replay the Olympic club of Paterson after the game was protested.

New England District

October 31, 1914

Rover F.C.	5–0	Academy
15', 25' Tommy Swords; 47', 2H' McLane; Jack Dalton

Athletic grounds, Fall River, MA
Referee: Schofield (Lawrence)
October 31, 1914

Bridgeport City	3–0	Presbyterian
Robinson; Chris Rose; Barrows

Newfield Park, Bridgeport, CT
Referee: J. Miller (New Haven)
October 31, 1914

Ansonia	1–2	Farr Alpaca
65' Austin		30' Hardman; 70' Hall

League Park, Ansonia, CT
Referee: T. Caldwell (Stamford)

New Jersey District

October 25, 1914

True Blue	0–1	Scottish American
		48' Whiston

Olympic Park, Paterson, NJ
Referee: D. Whyte (Brooklyn)
October 25, 1914

West Hudson	4–0	Rangers
3' Knowles; Buck Cooper (2); McHollan

West Hudson Oval, Harrison, NJ
Attendance: 2500
Referee: Andrew Laurie
October 25, 1914

Alley Boys	0–0	Hawthorne

Clark Athletic Field, East Newark, NJ
October 25, 1914

Greenville	4–0	Olympic
Schmidt; Hager; Spence; Kelosh

Jersey City baseball grounds
October 25, 1914

Jersey A.C.	4–1	Newark
28' Lennon; 40' Benny Lowe; 49' Jimmy Hayes (pk); 87' Benny Lowe		75' Brounridge

International League Park
Attendance: 600
Referee: Allen Montgomery
November 1, 1914

Totowa Rovers	0–0	Babcock & Wilcox

Willard Park, Paterson, NJ
Referee: Charles Ward

replays

October 31, 1914

Hawthorne	0–2	Alley Boys

Olympic Park, Paterson, NJ
November 8, 1914

Babcock & Wilcox	6–1	Totowa Rovers
25' Cooper; 40' Bert Holden; 50' Smith; Bert Holden; Wilson; Bert Holden		Boardman

Bayonne, NJ
Referee: M. Charles Ward
November 26, 1914

Greenville	1–2	Olympic
86' J. McLaughlin		15' William O'Neill; Bob McHugh

Jersey City baseball grounds
Referee: Nesbitt

New York District

October 25, 1914

Clan MacDonald	3–1	Bronx United

Hawthorne Field, Brooklyn, NY
October 25, 1914

Yonkers	3–0	Hollywood Inn
20' Petrie; Laurie (pk); 85' A.MacDonald

Tibbets Field, Yonkers, NY
Referee: I. Williams (Yonkers)
October 25, 1914

Brooklyn	1–1	Brooklyn Celtic
20' H.H. Shanholt		O'Hallaran

Marquette Oval, Brooklyn, NY
Referee: George Caldicott

replay

November 1, 1914

Brooklyn Celtic	5–1	Brooklyn
McGreavey; O'Hallaran; Lonie; O'Hallaran; Lonie		Sweeney

Marquette Oval, Brooklyn, NY
Attendance: 3000
Referee: George Caldicott

Philadelphia District

October 31, 1914

Bethlehem	6–0	West Philadelphia
Millar (5); Fleming (1)

East End Field, Bethlehem, PA
Referee: James Kerr
October 31, 1914

Henry Disston	5–1	Hibernian
3', 23', 65' Lynch; 80' Houison; Andrews		Foster

Disston Ball Park, Tacony, PA
Referee: Allen Montgomery (Newark)

Schenectady District

October 31, 1914

Locomotive	0–1	General Electric
		Mathieson

Locomotive grounds, Schenectady, NY
Attendance: 200
Referee: Jack

== Second round ==
The draw for the second round was held November 7, 1914 at the Continental hotel in Newark, NJ. Matches were due to be played on or before November 29. The General Electric/Farr Alpaca match was protested by Farr Alpaca alleging G.E. had ineligible players. The AFA ordered a replay however G.E. eventually withdrew from the competition.

November 26, 1914

Henry Disston	3–1	Bridgeport City
65' Kemp; 80' Lynch; Rogers		34' Ward

Tacony Ball Park
Referee: G. Allen (Philadelphia)
November 28, 1914

General Electric	3–2	Farr Alpaca
Bland; Mathieson; Bland		10' Arnold; Farnell

G.E. Park, Schenectady, NY
Attendance: 200
Referee: W. Cowie
November 28, 1914

Bethlehem	2–0	Clan MacDonald
20' Miller; Pepper

East End Field, Bethlehem, PA
Attendance: 1500
Referee: James Waldors
November 29, 1914

Babcock & Wilcox	2–2	West Hudson
5’ Findlay; 55’ Aitken		40’ Lowe; 50’ George Knowles

B&W grounds, Bayonne, NJ
Attendance: 200
Referee: A. Burnside
November 29, 1914

Scottish American	2–1	Alley Boys
30' Conlon; Archie Stark		Wuest

Clark Oval, East Newark, NJ
Attendance: 1500
Referee: Andrew Lawrie
December 6, 1914

Jersey A.C.	7–1	Rover F.C.
2' Jimmy Hayes; Smith; Lowe; Lennon		14' Gray; 55' Dalton

West Side Park, Jersey City
Attendance: 1000
Referee: John Nesbitt (NY)
December 6, 1914

Olympic	2–8	Brooklyn Celtic
McHugh; Rothwell		Lonie (4); O'Halloran (2); King; McGreevey

Olympic Park, Paterson, NJ
Attendance: 2000
Referee: Montgomery
December 20, 1914

Yonkers	1–3	Victor
Laurie		Tommy Gaynor (3)

Tibbets Field, Yonkers, NY
Referee: D.M. White

replays

December 6, 1914

West Hudson	5–0	Babcock & Wilcox
8' Brierley; 38', 62', 64' Harry Cooper; 52' McHollan

Harrison Oval
Referee: Alexander Burnside
December 19, 1914

Farr Alpaca	w/o	General Electric

Holyoke, MA

== Third round ==
December 27, 1914

West Hudson	4–1	Henry Disston
1' George Knowles; 57' Carter; 73' Jimmy McHolland; 90' Cooper (pk)		89' Kemp

West Hudson Oval, Harrison, NJ
Attendance: 2000
Referee: David M. Whyte (Brooklyn)
January 3, 1915

Scottish American	3–1	Victor
15', 67' Whiston; 88' Forfer		25' Brigham

Clark Athletic Field, East Newark
Referee: Alexander Burnside
January 9, 1915

Bethlehem	6–1	Farr Alpaca
15' Fleming; Fleming (pk); Graham (3); Millar		Hardman

East End Field, Bethlehem, PA
Referee: George Allen (Philadelphia)
January 10, 1915

Jersey A.C.	0–1	Brooklyn Celtic
		53' Albert Lonie

West Side Park, Jersey City
Attendance: 1200
Referee: Allan Montgomery

== Semifinals ==
March 14, 1915

Scottish American	2–1	West Hudson
1H' Angus Whiston; 64' Archie Stark		70' Cooper

Clark Athletic Field, East Newark
Attendance: 3500
Referee: D.M. Whyte (Brooklyn)
March 14, 1915

Brooklyn Celtic	2–1	Bethlehem
10' O'Hallaran; McQueen		55' Fleming

Marquette Oval, Brooklyn, NY
Attendance: 5000
Referee: Alexander Burnside

== Final ==
April 18, 1915

Scottish American	1–0	Brooklyn Celtic
70' Archie Stark

Athletic Park; Newark, New Jersey
Attendance: 3500
Referee: George Young (Philadelphia)

Lineups:
Scots- GK Joe Knowles, DF Mike Toman(c), Barry, MF Tom Stark, George P Rogers Sr, Alex Montieth, FW Joe Hemmesley, Archie Stark, Angus Whiston, Eddie Holt, Bunt Forlar.
Celtic- GK Mather, DF Robertson, McWilliams, MF Flanigan, McElroy, McGreevey, FW Campton, Lonie, O'Halloran, Mike King, McQueen.

== See also ==
- 1914–15 National Challenge Cup
- 1914–15 Southern New England Soccer League season
- 1914–15 National Association Foot Ball League season
