= 1913–14 American Cup =

Soccer tournament

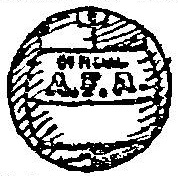

Tournament details
- Country: United States
- Dates: October 1912 – April 1913
- Teams: 41

Final positions
- Champions: Bethlehem (1st title)
- Runners-up: Tacony

The 1914 American Cup was the annual challenge cup held by the American Football Association. Forty-one teams entered the tournament. The Bethlehem team debuted in and won the tournament after defeating Tacony in the final.

== Preliminary round ==
The draw for the preliminary and first rounds was held September 13, 1913 at the Continental hotel in Newark, NJ. The 41 teams were divided up into Pennsylvania, New England, New York and New Jersey districts. The drawn match between Wilberforce and Newark was not replayed after it was determined Wilberforce used an ineligible player; the AFA subsequently awarded the game to Newark. Hollywood Inn did not show for their game with Brooklyn Celtic.
New Jersey District

October 5, 1913

Greenville	2–2	Hawthorne United
20' J. Smith; 87' McKnight		Sheilds (pk); 70' Gailey

Jersey City baseball grounds
Referee: A. Burnside
October 5, 1913

Rangers	2–0	Alley Boys
38' Spinnler; Stuart

Olympic park, Paterson, NJ
Referee: A. Montgomery
October 11, 1913

West Hudson	5–0	Carlton Hill
30' Lennox; Knowles (3); 70' Telford

Harrison, NJ
Referee: John Johnston
October 11, 1913

Totowa Rovers	4–2	Olympic
1H'; James Oldfield (2); 50'		1H'; 85'

Willard Park, Paterson, NJ
Referee: Harry Dale
October 12, 1913

Scottish American	1–1	Caledonian
McMillan		McPhail

Harrison Oval
October 12, 1913

Wilberforce	3–3	Newark
30' Holt; 60' Hayes; Broadbent (pk)		44' Dog; Robert; 87' Dunlop (pk)

Willard Park, Paterson, NJ
Referee: Charlie Ward (Passaic)
October 12, 1913

Jersey A.C.	3–1	Haledon Thistle
3' Starr; 25' Starr; 80' Mackay		Atkinson

Jersey City baseball grounds
Referee: Williams
October 12, 1913

True Blue	5–0	Riordan
11' Gradwell; 44' Alex Lowe; 70' Neilson; 85' Gradwell; 86' Alex Lowe

Olympic Park, Paterson, NJ
Referee: Harry Dale

replays

October 11, 1913

Hawthorne United	1–2	Greenville
Peacock		Smith (2)

Olympic Park, Paterson, NJ
Referee: A. Burnside
October 19, 1913

Scottish American	2–0	Caledonian
32' McMillan; 75' Green

Athletic Park, Vailsburg, NJ
Attendance: 500
Referee: Williams (Yonkers)

Pennsylvania District

October 11, 1913

Wissinoming	1–5	Bethlehem
McGraw		20' Galbraith; 60' Donaghy; Galbraith; Lance; Lawler

Philadelphia, PA
Attendance: 500
Referee: James Kerr

New York District

October 26, 1913

Brooklyn Celtic	w/o	Hollywood Inn

Celtic Park, Brooklyn, NY
Attendance: 2500

New England District – No games

== First round ==
The Rover F.C. of Fall River, MA had a bye. New Bedford forfeited their game with Ansonia. Caledonian forfeited their game with Bethlehem. In an unusual circumstance, Brooklyn had to replay their match with Clan MacDonald after already having completed their second round match on account of an ineligible player.

New England District

October 25, 1913

Ansonia	w/o	New Bedford

October 25, 1913

Farr Alpaca	7–1	Thistle
Cruikshank (3); Dowdall (2); Turner (2)		Francis

Holyoke, MA
Referee: A. Milne (New Haven)
November 1, 1913

Bridgeport City	1–0	Presbyterian

Newfield Park, Bridgeport, CT

Pennsylvania District

October 25, 1913

Bethlehem	w/o	Caledonian

October 25, 1913

Smith	0–8	Philadelphia Hibernian
		Scott (2); Swords (2); Barrett (2); McNichol; Hunt

Philadelphia, PA
Referee: James Steele
November 1, 1913

Trenton Hibernian	1–3	Tacony
Carlton		5' Swartz; Andrews; Brown

Hetzel's field, Trenton, NJ
Referee: Williams
November 1, 1913

Boys Club	2–3	Victor
5' Gallagher; 10' Bergen		Newton; Brigham; Gaynor (pk)

Philadelphia, PA
Referee: George Young

New York District

October 18, 1913

General Electric	3–2	Sons of St. George
10' Bland; 35' Mathieson; Mathieson		Valentine; McHugh

Fuller Street grounds, Schenectady, NY
October 26, 1913

Clan MacDonald	1–2	Brooklyn
85' Slade (pk)		10' Van der Weghe; Adamson

Marquette Oval, Brooklyn, NY
Referee: W. Burnside
October 26, 1913

American Locomotive	2–1	Schenectady
30' Hampton; Hampson		Griggs

Schenectady, NY
November 2, 1913

Bronx United	2–8	Celtic
Boynton; Scott		Lonie 2 King 2 O'Hallaran 2 McQueen; Campion

New Bronx Oval
Referee: Montgomery

replays

December 14, 1913

Clan MacDonald	1–2	Brooklyn
Harvey		Miller; 50' Adamson

Marquette Oval, Brooklyn, NY
Attendance: 2000
Referee: A. Montgomery

New Jersey District

October 26, 1913

True Blue	0–0	Newark

Olympic Park
Referee: John Nesbitt
October 26, 1913

Greenville	2–4	West Hudson
McLaughlin (2)		4' Lennox; Cooper; Montieth (2)

Jersey City Baseball Park
Referee: Allan Montgomery
October 26, 1913

Scottish American	2–2	Paterson Rangers
42' Green; 75' Purdy (pk)		3' Spinnler; 60' Hogan

West Hudson Oval, Harrison, NJ
Referee: Peet
November 2, 1913

Jersey A.C.	3–2	Totowa Rovers
Palfreyman; McKay; Best (pk)		Jimmy Oldfield (2)

Jersey City Baseball Park

replays

November 2, 1913

Newark	0–1	True Blue
		40' Stewart

Athletic Park, Vailsburg, NJ
Attendance: 2000
Referee: John Nesbitt
November 2, 1913

Scottish American	2–0	Paterson Rangers
75' Fenwick; 80' McDonald

West Hudson Oval, Harrison, NJ
Referee: Thomas Peet

== Second round ==
The draw for the second round was held November 1, 1913 at the Continental hotel in Newark, NJ. Matches were due to be played on or before November 30. The True Blue/Rover match was ordered replayed because of an ineligible player on the Fall River squad. The Paterson team advanced when the Rovers refused to take part in the replay. Brooklyn had to replay Bridgeport City after having to backtrack to a first round replay because both matches featured the same ineligible player.

November 22, 1913

Farr Alpaca	1–3	Bethlehem
40' Hall		50' Galbraith; 60' Lewis; 75' Fleming

Berkshire St ground, Holyoke, MA
Attendance: 700
Referee: A. Milne (New Haven)
November 27, 1914

Brooklyn	2–0	Bridgeport City
10' Black; 80' Hynds (pk)

Marquette Oval, Brooklyn, NY
Attendance: 2000
Referee: C. Creighton
November 27, 1913

Ansonia	1–3	West Hudson
18' Dickson		23' MacHollan; Knowles; 65' Cooper

League Park, Ansonia, CT
Attendance: 700
Referee: J. Booth (Bridgeport)
November 29, 1913

General Electric	3–6	Tacony
H. Bland; H. Mathieson; H. Bland (pk)		G. Kemp; P. Andrews; F. Brown; P. Andrews; P. Andrews; P. Andrews

G.E. grounds, Schenectady, NY
November 29, 1913

Hibernian	7–1	Celtic
7' Owens; Tommy Swords (3); 1H' Hunt; 66' Hunt; 86' Burrows		85' Lonie

Philadelphia, PA
Referee: James Walders
November 29, 1913

Locomotive	1–4	Victor
55' Hamilton		Tommy Gaynor (3); Jack Gaynor

Schenectady, NY
Referee: D. Jack
November 30, 1913

True Blue	0–2	Rovers
		25' Shaw; 72' Shaw

Olympic Park, Paterson, NJ
Attendance: 2000
Referee: Alex Burnside (Brooklyn)
November 30, 1913

Jersey A.C.	2–0	Scottish–Americans
Charley Zehnbauer (2)

Harrison Oval
Attendance: 1500
Referee: Adam Montgomery

replays

December 14, 1913

True Blue	w/o	Rovers

Olympic Park, Paterson, NJ
December 28, 1913

Brooklyn	5–1	Bridgeport City
Nichols; Adamson; Miller; Ford (2)		Robinson

Marquette Oval, Brooklyn, NY
Attendance: 2000
Referee: Andrew Laurie

== Third round ==
The draw for the third round was held December 6, 1913 at the Continental hotel in Newark, NJ. Matches were due to be played on or before December 28.

December 27, 1913

Bethlehem	1–1	West Hudson
65' Galbraith		85' Jimmy McHollan

East End Field, Bethlehem, PA
Attendance: 2000
Referee: D.M. White (Brooklyn)
December 27, 1913

Victor	1–1	Jersey A.C.
67' Arthur Newton		McKay

Philadelphia, PA
Attendance: 1500
Referee: A.M. Addison (New Jersey)
January 10, 1914

Hibernian	2–1	True Blue
Hunt; Scott		Lynch

West Hudson Oval, Harrison, NJ
Referee: Creighton (New York)
January 17, 1914

Tacony	3–1	Brooklyn
15' Schwartz; 48' Houison; Frankie Brown		Clark

Tacony baseball park
Referee: George Young (Philadelphia)

replays

January 4, 1914

West Hudson	1–1	Bethlehem
18' McHolland		6' Donaghey

West Hudson Oval, Harrison, NJ
Attendance: 500
Referee: D.M. Whyte (Brooklyn)
January 11, 1914

West Hudson	1–1	Bethlehem
32' Carter		27' Fleming

West Hudson Oval, Harrison, NJ
Attendance: 2500
Referee: Allan Montgomery
January 11, 1914

Jersey A.C.	0–0	Victor

Jersey City baseball ground
Referee: Andy Laurie (New Jersey)
January 25, 1914

Jersey A.C.	4–3	Victor
Charles Fisher (3); E. Newman		John Cooper (2); Brigham

West Hudson Oval, Harrison, NJ
Attendance: 2000
Referee: Andy Laurie (New Jersey)
January 31, 1914

Bethlehem	4–1	West Hudson
12' Donaghy; 49' Lance; 53', 69' Fleming		40' Lakeley

Tacony baseball park
Attendance: 465
Referee: Allen Montgomery (Newark)

== Semifinals ==
March 21, 1914

Tacony	4–1	Hibernian
33', 53' Brown; Hartwell (pk); Kemp		15' Tommy Swords

Tacony baseball park
Attendance: 3000
Referee: Andrew Laurie (Newark)
March 29, 1914

Jersey A.C.	2–2	Bethlehem
12' Newman; Smith		57' Jack Lance; Fleming

Jersey City baseball park
Attendance: 3000
Referee: Alexander Burnside

replay

April 4, 1914

Bethlehem	2–1	Jersey A.C.
58' Fleming (pk); 75' Fleming		27' Zehnbauer

Bethlehem, PA
Attendance: 3000
Referee: Alexander Burnside

== Final ==
April 19, 1914

Tacony F.C.	0–0	Bethlehem

Olympic Park; Paterson, New Jersey
Attendance: 3,500
Referee: Alan Montgomery

=== Replay ===
May 3, 1914

Tacony F.C.	0–1	Bethlehem
		Donaghy 15'

Athletic Park Newark, New Jersey
Attendance: 15,000
Referee: Alan Montgomery

== See also ==
- 1913–14 National Challenge Cup
- 1913–14 St. Louis Soccer League season
- 1913–14 National Association Foot Ball League season
