= Fall River Rovers =

- Full name: Fall River Rovers
- Founded: 1884; 142 years ago
- Dissolved: 1922; 104 years ago
- League: New England League: 1891–1909; Eastern Soocer League: 1909–1910; SNESL: 1915–1922
Home colors

Fall River Rovers were a United States soccer club, based in Fall River, Massachusetts. They won the 1887–88 and 1888–89 American Cups as well as the 1916–17 National Challenge Cup. In 1922 Rovers and Fall River United attempted to share rent on venue due to increasing costs. Subsequently their joint bid for an ASL slot in the 1922–23 season was rejected. They later disbanded with their players signing with other teams.

The name was revived during the 1933–34 season by a team that played in the New England Division of the American Soccer League. Other teams in the division included another Fall River United.

== History ==
=== Early years ===
In the late 19th century Fall River, Massachusetts, together with Kearny, New Jersey and St. Louis, Missouri, emerged as a stronghold for soccer in the United States. In the late 1870s Fall River experienced a period of economic growth, driven by the demand for cotton print cloth. Southeastern New England was the birthplace of the United States textile industry and Fall River became known as Spindle City. By 1876 the city was home to 43 factories, more than 30,000 looms and more than one million spindles. Keeping them all working required immigrant labor and, while some of the new arrivals were French Canadian and Irish, many also came from Lancashire and Glasgow, two of the earliest strongholds of soccer in the United Kingdom. As a result, several soccer clubs, including Rovers, emerged within the city. In February 1884, the team was founded at a meeting held on County Street, Fall River. The team joined the Bristol County Football Association in 1885. Other clubs from the city included Fall River Olympics, Fall River Pan Americans and Fall River East Ends. Rovers, along with these clubs became affiliated with the American Football Association and entered the American Cup. Between 1888 and 1892 teams from Fall River won the cup five times in succession. Fall River Rovers won it in both 1888 and 1889. In 1891, Rovers, along with the Fall River Olympics, East Enders and Pawtucket Free Wanderers, formed the New England League. In 1903, Rovers won the Interstate League championship. In 1907, they reentered the AFA. The Rovers were the New England League champions in 1909 before joining the first Eastern Professional Soccer League in 1910. When this league was abandoned during its only season, Rovers were in the lead. Between 1915 and 1921 they played in the Southern New England Soccer League, twice finishing as runners-up in 1917 and 1921. In 1917 they also won the Times Cup, the league cup of the SNESL, defeating J&P Coats 3–0 in the final.

=== Rivalry with Bethlehem Steel ===
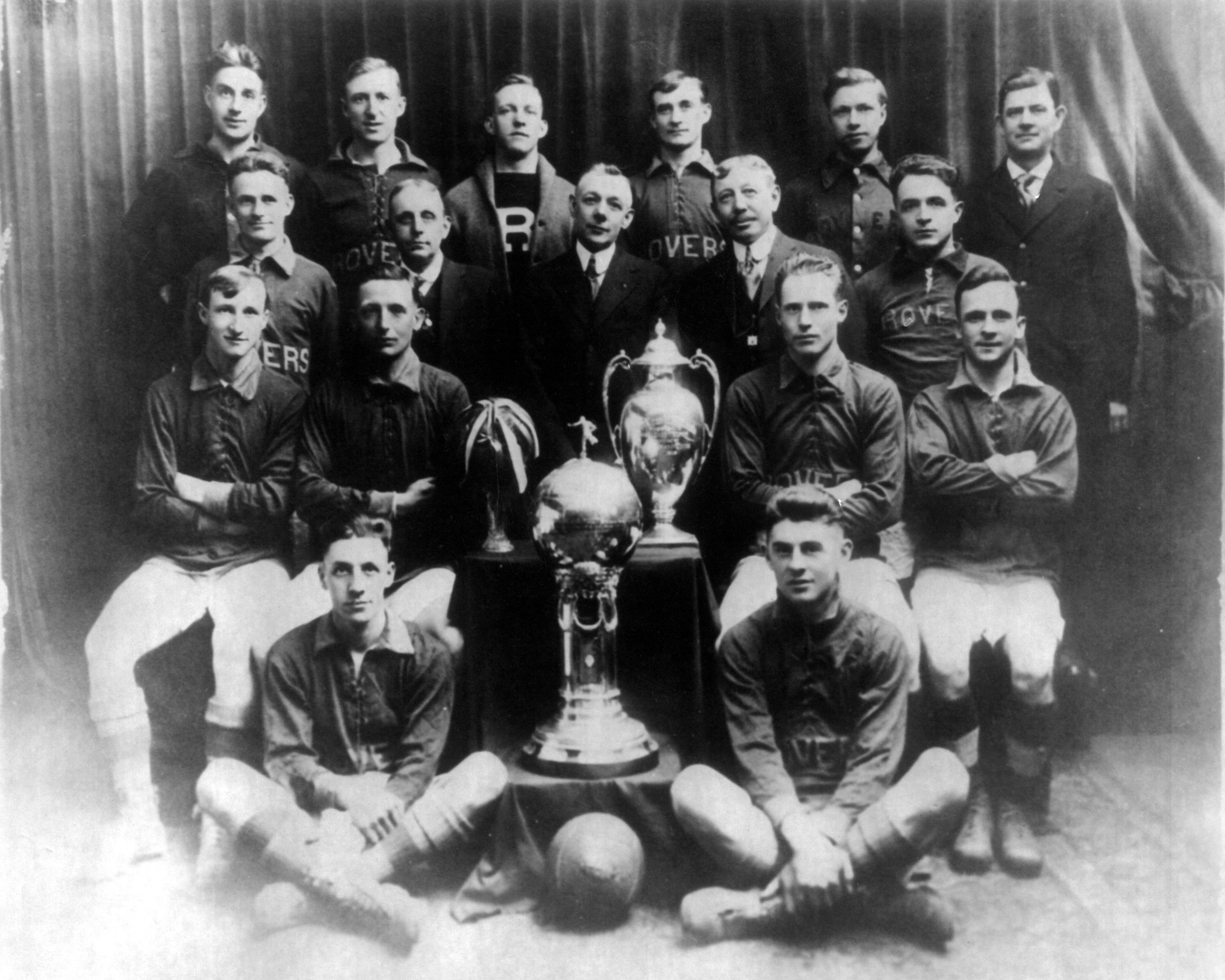
The 1917 Fall River Rovers team, winners of the National Challenge Cup

During the late 1910s a strong inter-regional rivalry developed between Rovers and Bethlehem Steel. The teams played against each other in three consecutive National Challenge Cup finals. Rovers were defeated in both the 1916 and the 1918 finals but won the competition in 1917. The rivalry was intensified by the fact that, at the time, Rovers featured mainly United States-born players while Steel relied heavily on players imported from both the Scottish Football League and the English Football League. In addition neither club was immune from fan violence. The 1916 final, hosted by J&P Coats in Pawtucket, Rhode Island, attracted a crowd of 10,000, almost all backing Rovers. With the score 0–0 after 80 minutes, Steel were awarded a penalty, triggering protests from both Rovers players and fans alike. Steel subsequently converted the penalty, which was enough to win the trophy. However, with seconds remaining Rovers were denied a penalty, sparking both a riot and a pitch invasion. The 1917 final saw Steel and Rovers return to Pawtucket to play in front of a crowd of 5,000. Rovers avenged their 1916 defeat with a goal scored in the first minute giving them a hard fought 1–0 win. The 1918 final saw the two teams return to Pawtucket for a third time, this time playing out a 2–2 extra-time draw in front of 10,000. However Rovers lost the replay 3–0 in Harrison, New Jersey. The star of the Rovers team during this era was Thomas Swords, who in 1916 captained the United States in their first official international. Other notable players included John Sullivan, who scored in both the 1917 and 1918 finals, and Chick Albion.

=== Year-by-year ===
Year	League	Reg. season	American Cup	National Challenge Cup
1885–86	Bristol County Association	2nd	N/A	N/A
1886–87	Bristol County Association	1st	N/A	N/A
1887–88	Bristol County Association	2nd	Champion	N/A
1888–89	Bristol County Association	1st	Champion	N/A
1889–90	Bristol County Association	1st	First Round (Note: Rovers withdrew from 1890 American Cup due to dispute with Pawtucket Free Wanderers and AFA)	N/A
1890–91	Bristol County Association	1st	Third Round	N/A
1891–92	Bristol County Association; NEL	2nd 2nd	Second Round	N/A
1892–93	NEL	3rd	Semifinals	N/A
1893–94	NEL	1st	Second Round	N/A
1894–95	NEL	No playoff	First Round	N/A
1895–96	NEL	Abandoned	Semifinals	N/A
1896–1903	Did not field a team			
1903–04	NEL	?	N/A	N/A
1904–05	NEL	?	N/A	N/A
1905–06	NEL	?	Second Round	N/A
1906–07	NEL	2nd	DNP	N/A
1907–08	NEL	2nd	Semifinals	?
1908–09	NEL	1st	Semifinals	?
1909–10	ESL	1st (Note: 1909-10 League abandoned with Rovers in lead with two games remaining)	Semifinals	N/A
1910-11	?	?	DNP	N/A
1911-12	NEL	?	Second Round	N/A
1912–13	?	?	Semifinals	N/A
1913–14	?	?	First Round (Note: The Rovers won their first round match, but refused to play a rematch after Paterson True Blues protest)	Suspended
1914–15	?	?	First Round	2nd Round
1915–16	SNESL	? (Note: League concluded with un-played games because For River had enough of lead.)	Semifinals	Runners Up
1916–17	SNESL	2nd	Did not Enter (Note: Rovers were prevented from entering based on New Jersey State Association limiting teams to two cup events, one being the state cup)	Champion
1917–18	SNESL	2nd (Note: League schedule not completed due to cup-tie game interference)	Quarterfinals	Runners Up
1918–19	Did not field team due to World War I			
1919–20	SNESL	1st	Quarterfinals	Fourth round
1920–21	SNESL	2nd	Semifinals	Fourth round

== Honors ==
- American Cup:
  - Winners (2): 1887–88, 1888–89
- National Challenge Cup
  - Winners (1): 1916–17
  - Runners Up (2): 1915–16, 1917–18
- Times Cup
  - Winners (1): 1917
- Bristol County Association
  - Winners (4): 1887, 1889, 1890, 1891
  - Runners Up (3): 1886, 1888, 1892
- New England League
  - Winners (2): 1894, 1909
  - Runners Up (3): 1892, 1907, 1908
- Eastern Profession Soccer League I
  - Winners (1): 1910
- Southern New England Soccer League
  - Winners (1): 1920
  - Runners Up (2): 1916–17, 1920–21
