= Fore River (soccer) =

Former soccer team from Quincy, Massachusetts

Fore River (also known as the Fore River Shipbuilding Company Stars) was an amateur U.S. soccer team which had its origins as the Fore River Shipbuilding company team of Quincy, Massachusetts.

== History ==
Early team records are spotty, but the team existed at least as early as 1907 Apparently, the team played in a series of local amateur leagues, including the New England League (NEL) which featured several of the better U.S. teams of that era. The only year for which NEL standings exist are 1908-1909 when Fore River finished fourth. In 1915, the team won the Massachusetts State Cup with a victory over Lynne Fosse F.C. They won a second cup title in 1919 and its third in 1921.

In 1915, Fore River entered the Southern New England Soccer League (SNESL). His amateur league attempted to create a sustainable league which spanned an area larger than that covered by most city leagues. In its first season in the league, Fore River topped the standings when the remainder of the season was canceled due to numerous weather cancelations. In 1918, the league suspended operations as a result of the loss of players to military service in World War I. Fore River then moved to the Boston League for the 1918-1919 season. Fore River returned to the SNESL in 1919, but there are no records for this season. The team reached its greatest success in the 1920-1921 season. It won the league title,Litterer, David (February 19, 2005). "USA - Southern New England Soccer League". www.rsssf.org. reached the final of the American Cup and went to the fifth round of the National Challenge Cup. However, the creation of the American Soccer League (ASL) led to the collapse of both the SNESL and the National Association Football League when several top teams from both leagues defected to the ASL.

== Year-by-year ==
Year	League	Reg. season	American Cup	National Challenge Cup
1908/09	NEL	4th	did not enter	N/A
1909/10	?	?	did not enter	N/A
1910/11	?	?	did not enter	N/A
1911/12	?	?	Third Round	N/A
1912/13	?	?	First Round	N/A
1913/14	?	?	?	did not enter
1914/15	?	?	?	Quarterfinals
1915/16	SNESL	1st	First Round	Second Round
1916/17	SNESL	8th	?	First round
1917/18	SNESL	?	Semifinals	Third round
1918/19	Boston	1st	First Round	Quarterfinals
1919/20	SNESL	?	Semifinals	Final
1920/21	SNESL	1st	Final	Quarterfinals

== Honors ==
American Cup

- Runner Up (1): 1921

National Challenge Cup

- Runner Up (1): 1920

Massachusetts State Cup

- Winner (3): 1914, 1919, 1921

League Championship

- Winner (3): 1916, 1919, 1921
