= 1923–24 J. & P. Coats F.C. season =

J. & P. Coats F.C.
1923-24 season
- Stadium: Coats Field
- American Soccer League: 4th
- National Challenge Cup: Second Round; Eastern Division
- American Cup: Third Round
- Top goalscorer: Tommy Fleming (20)
- Biggest win: 6 goals 7-1 vs. Philadelphia F.C. (20 October 1923)
- Biggest defeat: 7 goals 0-7 at Brooklyn Wanderers F.C. (27 January 1924)

The 1923–24 J. & P. Coats F.C. season was the third season for the club in the American Soccer League. The club finished the season in 4th place.

== American Soccer League ==
Date	Opponents	H/A	Result F–A	Scorers	Attendance
6 October 1923	National Giants F.C.	H	2-2	Fleming (2)	
13 October 1923	Fall River F.C.	H	2-2	Fleming (2)	
14 October 1923	Fall River F.C.	A	1-2	Fleming	
20 October 1923	Philadelphia F.C.	H	7-1	Harvey, McLeavy, Fleming, Adam (2)	
27 October 1923	Newark F.C.	H	5-2	Harvey (2), Drummond, Fleming, Adam	
3 November 1923	Brooklyn Wanderers F.C.	H	2-1	McLeavy, Fleming	
25 November 1923	Brooklyn Wanderers F.C.	A	2-3	Fleming (2)	
8 December 1923	Fall River F.C.	H	0-2		
15 December 1923	Philadelphia F.C.	A	4-2	Harvey, McLeavy, Adam, Fleming	
16 December 1923	National Giants F.C.	A	1-3	Adam	
22 December 1923	Bethlehem Steel F.C.	A	0-6		
23 December 1923	New York S.C.	A	3-3	McLeavy, Fleming, Shepard	
29 December 1923	National Giants S.C.	H	3-0	McLeavy, Littleford (2)	
5 January 1924	Bethlehem Steel F.C.	H	0-1		
20 January 1924	Fall River F.C.	A	2-3	McLeavy, Fleming	
27 January 1924	Brooklyn Wanderers F.C.	A	0-7		
15 March 1924	Bethlehem Steel F.C.	A	1-1	Fleming	
16 March 1924	New York S.C.	A	3-3	Drummond, Fleming, Adam	
22 March 1924	Philadelphia F.C.	H	3-2	McAvoy, Adam (2)	
29 March 1924	Bethlehem Steel F.C.	H	3-2	Drummond, Fleming, Adam	
5 April 1924	Newark F.C.	H	4-0		
26 April 1924	Brooklyn Wanderers F.C.	H	3-2	Fleming, Adam, Hibbert	
May 1924	New York S.C.	H	0-2		
17 May 1924	New York S.C.	H	3-1	Fleming, Adam (2)	
8 June 1924	National Giants S.C.	A	5-1	Drummond, Fleming (2), Adam, Hibbert	

Pos	Club	Pld	W	D	L	GF	GA	GD	Pts
1	Fall River F.C.	27	19	6	2	59	19	+40	44
2	Bethlehem Steel F.C.	28	18	4	6	63	33	+30	40
3	New York S.C.	28	15	8	5	67	39	+28	38
4	J. & P. Coats F.C.	25	11	5	9	59	54	+5	27
5	Brooklyn Wanderers F.C.	27	9	5	13	47	57	-10	23
6	National Giants F.C.	26	6	6	14	36	64	-28	18
7	Philadelphia F.C.	26	5	3	18	30	64	-34	13
8	Newark F.C.	23	3	1	19	20	53	-33	7

Pld = Matches played; W = Matches won; D = Matches drawn; L = Matches lost; GF = Goals for; GA = Goals against; Pts = Points

== National Challenge Cup ==
Date	Round	Opponents	H/A	Result F–A	Scorers	Attendance
10 November 1923	Second Round; Eastern Division	Fall River F.C.	H	3-3	Drummond, McLeavy, Adam	
9 March 1924	Second Round; Eastern Division (replay)	Fall River F.C.	A	0-4		

== American Football Association Cup ==
Date	Round	Opponents	H/A	Result F–A	Scorers	Attendance
13 January 1924	Third Round	Crompton F.C.	H	1-2	Fleming	

== Notes and references ==
Bibliography

- Jose, Colin (1998). The American Soccer League: The Golden Years of American Soccer 1921-1931. Lanham, Maryland: Scarecrow Press. ISBN 978-0810834293.
- Cahill, Thomas W., ed. (1923). Spalding's Official "Soccer" Football Guide 1923-24. Spalding's "Red Cover" Series of Athletic Handbooks, No. 55R. New York: American Sports Publishing Company.

Footnotes
