= Chick Albion =

American soccer player

Personal information
- Full name: John Albion
- Date of birth: 1890
- Place of birth: Fall River, Massachusetts, United States
- Position: Goalkeeper

Senior career*
Years	Team	Apps	(Gls)
–1921	Fall River Rovers		
1921–1922	Fall River United	24	(0)
- * Club domestic league appearances and goals

John "Chick" Albion (1890 – ?) was an American soccer goalkeeper who played in the Southern New England Soccer League and the American Soccer League. He was a three time National Challenge Cup finalist, winning one title, with the Fall River Rovers.

It is unknown when or where Albion began his career, but he was with the Fall River Rovers of the Southern New England Soccer League as early as the spring of 1915. In the spring of 1916, he backstopped the Rovers to the 1916 National Challenge Cup finals where they fell to Bethlehem Steel. The Rovers would meet Bethlehem in the next two challenge cups, winning in 1917 and losing again in 1918. Albion remained the Rovers’ starting goalkeeper in all three tournaments.

Albion spent one season in the newly created American Soccer League with Fall River United. He saw time in 24 games, allowing 57 goals for a 2.38 GAA.
