= Frank Booth (American soccer) =

American soccer player

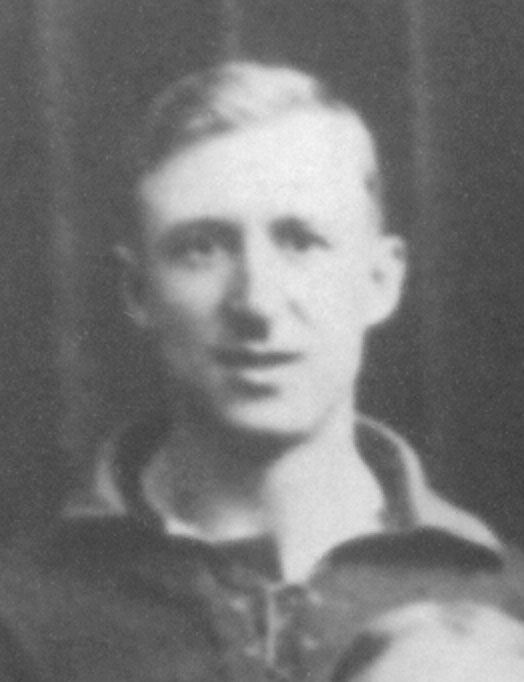
- Booth in 1917

Personal information
- Date of birth: 1887
- Place of birth: Fall River, Massachusetts, United States
- Date of death: 1950 (aged 62–63)
- Place of death: Fall River, MA, United States
- Position: Right full back

Senior career*
Years	Team	Apps	(Gls)
1910–1921	Fall River Rovers		
1921–1922	Fall River United	20	(0)
- * Club domestic league appearances and goals

Frank Booth (1887–1950) was an American soccer right full back who spent one season in the American Soccer League and six in the Southern New England Soccer League. He was born in Fall River, Massachusetts.

Booth played for the Fall River Rovers of the Southern New England Soccer League beginning at least during the 1915–1916 season, if not earlier. In 1916, 1917 and 1918, the Rovers met Bethlehem Steel in the finals of the National Challenge Cup. The team lost in 1916 and 1918, but won in 1917. Booth played all three finals. He remained with the Rovers until the establishment of the American Soccer League in 1921. That year, he signed with Fall River United of the new league. He spent only one season, playing twenty league and two National Challenge Cup games before leaving the league at the end of the season.
