= Frank Booth =

Frank Booth may refer to:

- Frank Booth (English footballer) (1882–1919), English football player for Manchester City F.C. and the England national team
- Frank Booth (American soccer) (1887–1955), American soccer player from Fall River, Massachusetts
- Frank Booth (cricketer) (1907–1980), English cricketer who played for Lancashire CCC
- Frank Booth (swimmer) (1910–1980), American swimmer who won a silver medal in the 1932 Olympics
- Frank Booth (Australian footballer) (1916–1974), Australian footballer for Collingwood and Hawthorn
- Frank Booth (Blue Velvet), the villain from the film Blue Velvet
