= Pawtucket Rangers =

American soccer club

J. & P. Coats was an American soccer club founded in 1900 as the team of the Pawtucket, Rhode Island branch of the J. & P. Coats threadmaking company of Paisley, Scotland (following a 1952 merger this firm became part of the Coats Group).

The club played won the Rhode Island League in 1914 then was an inaugural member of the semi-pro Southern New England Soccer League. The club then joined the professional American Soccer League as an inaugural member.

After the first half of the 1928/29 season, the team ran into financial trouble and was bought by new management. The new owners renamed the team the Pawtucket Rangers.

The club left the original ASL sometime after the 1932 fall season and joined the New England Division of the new ASL that was formed in 1933/34.

The team won the Times Cup in 1919.

== Year-by-year ==
Year	Division	League	Reg. season	Playoffs	American Cup	National Cup
1911/12	N/A	?	?	?	Second Round	N/A
1912/13	N/A	?	?	?	did not enter	N/A
1913/14	N/A	RIL	1st	Champion	did not enter	N/A
1914/15	N/A	SNESL	3rd	No playoff	did not enter	Semifinals
1915/16	N/A	SNESL	Schedule not finished		did not enter	Second round
1916/17	N/A	SNESL	3rd	No playoff	did not enter	First round
1917/18	N/A	SNESL	1st	Champion (no playoff)	Second round	Second Round
1918/19	N/A	SNESL	Season canceled due to WWI		Quarterfinals	Third round
1919/20	N/A	SNESL	?	?	Round of 16	Third round
1920/21	N/A	SNESL	3rd	No playoff	?	First Round
1921/22	1	ASL	2nd	No playoff	N/A	Fourth round
1922/23	1	ASL	1st	Champion (no playoff)	Finals	Semifinals
1923/24	1	ASL	4th	No playoff	Third Round	First round
1924/25	1	ASL	7th	No playoff	N/A	did not enter
1925/26	1	ASL	8th	No playoff	N/A	Finals
1926/27	1	ASL	9th	No playoff	N/A	First round
1927/28	1	ASL	8th (1st half); 9th (2nd half)	did not qualify	N/A	Finals
1928/29	N/A	ASL	8th (1st half); 3rd (2nd half)	No playoff	N/A	did not enter
Fall 1929	N/A	ASL	5th	No playoff	N/A	did not enter
1930	N/A	ACL/ASL	6th (Spring); 9th (Fall)	No playoff	N/A	Semifinals
1931	N/A	ASL	4th (Spring); 3rd (Fall)	No playoff	N/A	First round
Spring 1932	N/A	ASL	4th	No playoff	N/A	Second round
Fall 1932	N/A	ASL	2nd	No playoff	N/A	Second round
Spring 1933	N/A	?	?	?	N/A	Finals
1933/34	N/A	ASL II	4th (Spring); 5th (Fall)	?	N/A	Final
1934/35	N/A	ASL II	1st (Spring); 3rd (Fall)	Runner-Up	N/A	Final
1935/36	N/A	ASL II	Withdrew	N/A	N/A	did not enter
1936/37	N/A	ASL II	9th (Spring); 8th (Fall)	N/A	N/A	did not enter
1937/38	N/A	ASL II	Withdrew	N/A	N/A	did not enter
1938/39	N/A	?	?	?	N/A	did not enter
1939/40	N/A	ASL II	6th (Fall); 1st (Spring)	Champions	N/A	Second Round
1940/41	N/A	ASL II	2nd (Fall); 1st (Spring)	Runners-up	N/A	Champions
1941/42	N/A	?	?	?	N/A	Finals
