= 1915–16 National Challenge Cup =

American soccer tournament season

- Dewar Challenge Cup

Tournament details
- Country: United States

Final positions
- Champions: Bethlehem Steel (2nd title)
- Runners-up: Fall River Rovers

The 1915–16 National Challenge Cup was the third tournament of the modern-day Lamar Hunt U.S. Open Cup. Bethlehem Steel won its second consecutive championship. The entries for the competition were to be made by midnight September 30, 1915. The draw for the qualifying and first rounds was made on October 2, 1915. The tournament schedule was originally set for the qualifying round to take place on or before October 24; first round, November 14; second round, December 12; third round, January 16, 1916; fourth round, March 5; semis, April 2, and final on April 30.

== Bracket ==
Home teams listed on top of bracket

Second Round; Dec 11 - Feb 27
PA	Braddock	3
PA	Beadling F.C.	1
OH	Cleveland Thistles	1
OH	Cleveland A.F.C.	0
IL	Pullman F.C.	3
IL	MacDuff	1
MI	Packard F.C.	4^{a}
MI	St. George F.C.	3
NJ	West Hudson A.A.	0-2
NY	Yonkers F.C.	0-0
NJ	Babcock & Wilcox	8
NY	Rochester City	0
PA	Bethlehem Steel	1-3
PA	Disston A.A.	1-0
PA	Viscose F.C.	6^{a}
PA	Philadelphia Hibernian	9
MA	General Electrics F.C.	2
MA	Fore River	1
MA	New Bedford F.C.	1
MA	New Bedford Celtic	0
MA	Fall River Rovers	1
MA	Pan-American F.C.	0
MA	Lynn Hibernian	1-3
MA	Boston American	1-0
RI	Crompton F.C.	2
RI	J&P Coats	1
CT	Bridgeport City A.F.C.	3
MA	Farr Alpaca F.C.	3^{b}
NY	Continentals F.C.	3
NY	IRT Strollers	0
NY	Brooklyn Celtic	5
NJ	Jersey A.C.	4

Third Round; Jan 15 - Apr 2
PA	Braddock	1
OH	Cleveland Thistles	3
IL	Pullman F.C.	2
MI	Packard F.C.	0
NJ	West Hudson A.A.	2
NJ	Babcock & Wilcox	1
PA	Bethlehem Steel	6
PA	Philadelphia Hibernian	0
MA	General Electrics F.C.	2
MA	New Bedford F.C.	7
MA	Fall River Rovers	4
MA	Lynn Hibernians	0
RI	Crompton F.C.	0
CT	Bridgeport City A.F.C.	2
NY	Continentals F.C.	1
NY	Brooklyn Celtic	0

Quarterfinals; Mar 5 - Apr 8
OH	Cleveland Thistles	1
IL	Pullman F.C.	3
NJ	West Hudson A.A.	0
PA	Bethlehem Steel	1
MA	New Bedford F.C.	1-0
MA	Fall River Rovers	1-6
CT	Bridgeport City A.F.C.	0
NY	Continentals F.C.	1

Semifinals; April 15,16,26
IL	Pullman F.C.	0-1
PA	Bethlehem Steel	0-2
MA	Fall River Rovers	1
NY	Continentals F.C.	0

Final; May 6
PA	Bethlehem Steel	1
MA	Fall River Rovers	0

a) aggregate after 3 games
b) forfeit replay

== Final ==
May 6, 1916

Bethlehem Steel (PA)	1–0	Fall River Rovers (MA)
Fleming 78' (pen.)	Report

Coats Field, Pawtucket, Rhode Island
Attendance: 10,000
Referee: David M. Whyte (USA)
- (Scotland) Bill Duncan
- (England) Sam Fletcher
- (United States) Jock Ferguson
- (United States) Thomas Murray
- (United States) James Campbell
- (Scotland) Bob Morrison (c)
- Samuel MacDonald
- (England) Fred Pepper
- (United States) Neil Clarke
- (Ireland) Paddy Butler
- (Scotland) Tommy Fleming
- Manager: Horace Lewis
- (United States) Chick Albion
- (United States) Frank Booth
- Charles Burns
- Frederick Burns
- Pierre Bouchard
- William Stone
- Arthur Morgan
- John Sullivan
- John Dalton
- (United States) Thomas Swords (c)
- Oliva Garant
- Manager: Randolph Howarth

== See also ==
- 1916 American Cup

== Sources ==
USOpenCup.com
