= 1922–23 J. & P. Coats F.C. season =

J. & P. Coats F.C.
1922–23 season
- Stadium: Coats Field
- American Soccer League: Winners
- National Challenge Cup: Final; Eastern Division
- American Cup: Runners-up
- Top goalscorer: Tommy Fleming (22)
- Biggest win: 6 goals 6-0 vs. Ansonia F.C. (23 December 1922); 6-0 vs. Crompton F.C. (???)
- Biggest defeat: 2 goals 0-2 vs. New York S.C. (21 October 1922); 1-3 at New York S.C. (20 May 1923)

The 1922–23 J. & P. Coats F.C. season was the second season for the club in the American Soccer League. The club won the league.

== American Soccer League ==
Date	Opponents	H/A	Result F–A	Scorers	Attendance
8 October 1922	Fall River F.C.	A	1-0	Gallagher	
21 October 1922	New York S.C.	H	0-2		
28 October 1922	Philadelphia F.C.	A	3-0	Gallagher, Lappin, Fleming	
29 October 1922	Paterson F.C.	A	1-2	Fleming	
11 November 1922	Harrison S.C.	H	0-0		
18 November 1922	Paterson F.C.	H	3-2	Neilson, Gallagher, Fleming	
2 December 1922	Philadelphia F.C.	H	3-1	Neilson, Shepard, Fleming	
9 December 1922	Bethlehem Steel F.C.	H	2-1	McIntosh, Lappin	4,000
16 December 1922	Brooklyn Wanderers F.C.	H	5-3	Neilson, Shepard, Fleming (2), Gilmore	
31 December 1922	Fall River F.C.	A	2-3	Neilson, Fleming	
6 January 1923	Bethlehem Steel F.C.	A	1-1	Fleming	5,000
20 January 1923	Philadelphia F.C.	A	6-2	McIntosh, Neilson, Shepard, Lappin, Fleming, McAvoy	
21 January 1923	Brooklyn Wanderers F.C.	A	3-0	Gallagher, Lappin, Fleming	
24 February 1923	Philadelphia F.C.	H	3-2	McIntosh, Lappin, Fleming	
10 March 1923	Brooklyn Wanderers F.C.	H	3-0	Neilson, Gallagher, Fleming	
17 March 1923	Fall River F.C.	H	3-1	Fleming (2), Gilmore	
31 March 1923	Brooklyn Wanderers F.C.	H	1-0	Fleming	
7 April 1923	Fall River F.C.	H	2-1	Neilson, Fleming	
8 April 1923	Harrison S.C.	A	1-0	Morley	
14 April 1923	Bethlehem Steel F.C.	H	1-0	Gilmore	
21 April 1923	Harrison S.C.	H	6-1	Shepard (3), Fleming (2), A. G. Bell	
22 April 1923	New York S.C.	A	2-1	Fleming (2)	
12 May 1923	New York S.C.	H	5-1	Shepard (4), Fleming	
13 May 1923	Harrison S.C.	H	3-1	Fleming, Adam (2)	
19 May 1923	Paterson F.C.	H	5-2	Shepard (3), Adam (2)	
20 May 1923	New York S.C.	A	1-3	William	
2 June 1923	Bethlehem Steel F.C.	A	forfeit loss (Note: Game forfeited to Bethlehem Steel F.C. at meeting of ASL on 10 June 1923.)		
3 June 1923	Paterson F.C.	A	2-0	McAvoy, Gilmore	

Pos	Club	Pld	W	D	L	GF	GA	GD	Pts
1	J. & P. Coats F.C.	28	21	2	5	68	30	+38	44
2	Bethlehem Steel F.C.	28	18	6	4	59	26	+33	42
3	Fall River F.C.	28	15	5	8	53	36	+17	35
4	New York S.C.	23	10	4	9	53	42	+11	24
5	Paterson F.C.	20	9	4	7	38	31	+7	22
6	Brooklyn Wanderers F.C.	25	5	5	15	24	52	-28	15
7	Harrison S.C.	23	4	2	17	26	56	-30	10
8	Philadelphia F.C.	25	3	2	20	24	72	-48	8

Pld = Matches played; W = Matches won; D = Matches drawn; L = Matches lost; GF = Goals for; GA = Goals against; Pts = Points

== National Challenge Cup ==
Date	Round	Opponents	H/A	Result F–A	Scorers	Attendance
14 October 1922	First Round; Eastern Division; Southern New England District	Saylesville F.C.	H	3-2	McIntosh, Lappin (2)	
4 November 1922	Second Round; Eastern Division; Southern New England District	Fall River F.C.	H	3-1	Lappin (2), Morley	
25 November 1922	Third Round; Eastern Division; Southern New England District	Greystone Veterans F.C.	H	4-0		
23 December 1922	Fourth Round; Eastern Division; New York, New Jersey, Eastern Pennsylvania and Connecticut District	Ansonia F.C.	H	6-0		
3 January 1923	Semifinals; Eastern Division; New England District	Abbot Worsted F.C.	A	1-0	Gallagher	
25 March 1923	Final; Eastern Division	Paterson F.C.	at Harrison Oval	2-3	Neilson (2)	

== American Cup ==
Date	Round	Opponents	H/A	Result F–A	Scorers	Attendance
???	First Round	Prospect Hill F.C.	?	3-2		
???	Second Round	Greystone Veterans F.C.	?	6-1		
???	Third Round	Crompton F.C.	?	6-0		
???	Fourth Round	Saylesville F.C.	?	forfeit win		
29 April 1923	Semifinal	Fore River F.C.	at Kinsley Park	4-0	Bethune, Gallagher, Fleming, McAvoy	
6 May 1923	Final	Fleisher Yarn F.C.	at Mark's Stadium	0-2		

== Exhibitions ==
Date	Opponents	H/A	Result F–A	Scorers	Attendance
30 September 1922	Dick, Kerr Ladies F.C.	H	4-4		

== Notes and references ==
Bibliography

- Jose, Colin (1998). The American Soccer League: The Golden Years of American Soccer 1921-1931. Lanham, Maryland: Scarecrow Press. ISBN 978-0810834293.
- Cahill, Thomas W., ed. (1922). Spalding's Official "Soccer" Football Guide 1922-23. Spalding's "Red Cover" Series of Athletic Handbooks, No. 55R. New York: American Sports Publishing Company.
- Cahill, Thomas W., ed. (1923). Spalding's Official "Soccer" Football Guide 1923-24. Spalding's "Red Cover" Series of Athletic Handbooks, No. 55R. New York: American Sports Publishing Company.

Footnotes
