= Robert Drummond =

Robert Drummond or Bob Drummond may refer to:

- Robert Drummond (businessman) (1791–1834), early Canadian businessman
- Robert Hay Drummond (1711–1776), Archbishop of York
- Robert James Drummond (1858–1951), moderator of the United Free Church of Scotland in 1918
- Robert Drummond (gridiron football) (born 1967), former gridiron football running back
- Robert Drummond of Carnock (died 1592), Master of Work to the Crown of Scotland
- Rob Drummond (born 1986), Canadian ice hockey player
- Bob Drummond (footballer, born 1898) (1898–?), Scottish association footballer
- Bob Drummond (Australian footballer) (1919–1991), Australian rules footballer
