= Johnny Harvey =

Scottish-American soccer player

Personal information
- Place of birth: Scotland
- Position: Outside right

Senior career*
Years	Team	Apps	(Gls)
1923–1927	J&P Coats	127	(22)
1927–1928	Fall River F.C.	43	(8)
1928–1929	Pawtucket Rangers	105	(21)
1931	New Bedford Whalers	4	(0)
1931	Fall River F.C.	5	(1)
1931	Pawtucket Rangers	18	(4)
Total		302	(56)
- * Club domestic league appearances and goals

Johnny Harvey was an early-twentieth-century Scottish-American association football forward.

Records of Harvey's career are fragmentary, but he played for J&P Coats during the 1915–1916 Southern New England Soccer League season. In 1923, he was back with J&P Coats as it played in the American Soccer League. In 1927, he began the season with Coats, played eleven games, then moved to the Fall River F.C. for the remainder of the season. He returned to J&P Coats which was renamed the Pawtucket Rangers under new ownership. In 1931, he jumped through three teams, the New Bedford Whalers, 'Marksmen' and Rangers.
