= New York IRT =

New York IRT may refer to:

- Interborough Rapid Transit Company, a defunct company that provided subway service in New York City from 1904 to 1940
- New York IRT (soccer team), a twentieth-century American soccer team sponsored by the aforementioned company
