= Tommy Fleming (soccer) =

Scots American soccer player (1890–1965)

Personal information
- Full name: Thomas Cochran Turner Fleming
- Date of birth: January 15, 1890
- Place of birth: Beith, Scotland
- Date of death: March 19, 1965 (aged 75)
- Place of death: Quincy, Massachusetts, USA
- Position: Outside forward

Youth career
- 1901–1906: Beith

Senior career*
Years	Team	Apps	(Gls)
1906–1907	Beith		
1907–	Fore River		
- Morton
1914–1921	Bethlehem Steel		
1921–1922	→ Philadelphia Field Club	24	(15)
1922–1924	J&P Coats	49	(41)
1924–1928	Boston Soccer Club	161	(38)
1928–1929	Fall River	0	(0)

Managerial career
- Quincy High School
- * Club domestic league appearances and goals

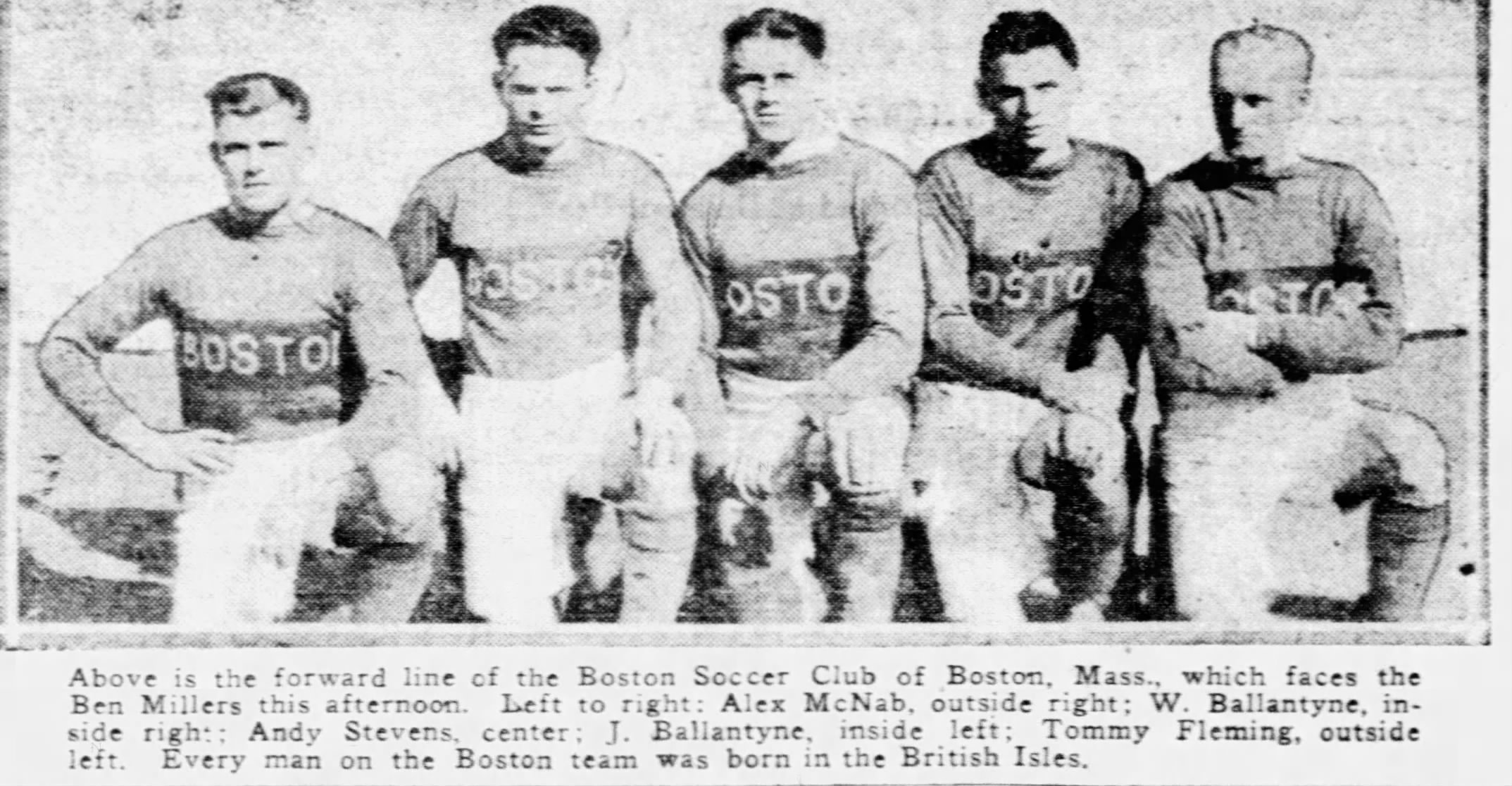
Fleming (far left) and other Boston Soccer Club players in 1925

Thomas "Tommy" or "Whitey" Fleming (January 15, 1890 in Beith, Scotland – March 19, 1965 in Quincy, Massachusetts) was a Scottish American soccer outside forward who began his career in Scotland and finished it in the United States. During his Hall of Fame career, Fleming won five American Cups, four National Challenge Cups and at least eight league titles.

== Youth ==
Nickname "Whitey" due to his white hair, Fleming began his career as an apprentice with Scottish Football League Third Division club Beith F.C. when he was eleven. Three years later, he quit school to devote himself full-time to his athletic career. In 1907, Beith F.C. won the Ayrshire Cup, but Fleming was becoming dissatisfied with the club. When it refused to raise his wages or release him from his contract, he decided to move to the United States.

== Professional ==
In September 1907, Fleming arrived in Quincy, Massachusetts, and went to work in the Fore River Shipyard, signing with the company team, of the New England League. The team won the 1908 league and league cup titles. At some point, Fleming returned to Scotland where he signed with Morton. In 1913, he left Scotland for good to sign with Bethlehem F.C. of the amateur Allied American Football Association of Philadelphia. His move was again prompted by the issue of money. Bethlehem Steel offered players both $15 per week to play soccer and a position in the steel yard. The first game in which Fleming appears in a Bethlehem line up was a November 17, 1913 victory over Schuylkill Falls. In May, Bethlehem won the league cup. It also won the league title, giving Fleming a double. Over the next seven seasons, Fleming won four National Challenge Cups (1915, 1916, 1918, 1919). They also won the league cup in 1915. In 1917, the Steelmen joined the professional National Association Football League (NAFBL), winning the league's last three titles (1919, 1920, 1921). They also won the defunct American Cup in 1914, 1916, 1917, 1918 and 1919. The America Cup was the American Football Association cup, played from 1884 to 1920.

In 1921, the American Soccer League was created by the merger of teams from the NAFBL and the Southern New England Soccer League in order to provide a more stable professional league. The Bethlehem Steel ownership decided for financial reasons to move the team to Philadelphia, renaming the team the Philadelphia Field Club for the new league's first season. Philadelphia won the first league championship. At the end of the season, Philadelphia returned to Bethlehem. In July 1922, Fleming, surprising the team management and fans, announced his intention to pursue other playing opportunities. He signed with J&P Coats soon after. That season, J&P Coats won the league championship as Fleming scored twenty-two goals. Many of Flemings goals came from the penalty spot as he was the team's preferred penalty kick taker. This was in line with his time at Bethlehem when he made 39 of 40 penalty kicks. In August 1924, Fleming signed with the Boston Soccer Club. He spent the next five seasons in Boston, winning the 1928 league championship. In 1929, he played one league cup game with the Fall River.

== Coaching ==
When he retired from playing professionally, Fleming became a coach with Quincy High School.

== National Soccer Hall of Fame ==
The U.S. National Soccer Hall of Fame inducted Fleming in 2005 as part of a process of recognizing significant pre-1950s players. According to the Hall of Fame, "We were aware that in the early decades of the Hall of Fame a number of outstanding players had slipped through the cracks of the selection process. In order to correct these oversights we established a Blue Ribbon panel consisting of historians Colin Jose, Roger Allaway and Hall of Famer Walter Bahr, to review the credentials of all Veterans from the pre-NASL era. Out of a total of 150 players who met the eligibility criteria, the panel unanimously recommended, and the Board approved, the special induction of these five players." Fleming was among the five selected.
