= Governor's Cup (Kentucky) =

American college football rivalry

Kentucky–Louisville football rivalry
- Kentucky Wildcats Louisville Cardinals
- Sport: Football
- First meeting: October 26, 1912; Kentucky, 41–0
- Latest meeting: November 29, 2025; Louisville, 41–0
- Next meeting: November 28, 2026 at Kentucky
- Stadiums: Kentucky – Kroger Field; Louisville – L&N Federal Credit Union Stadium
- Trophy: The Governor's Cup

Statistics
- Total meetings: 37
- All-time series: Kentucky leads, 19–17
- Trophy series: Louisville leads, 17–13
- Largest victory: Kentucky, 73–0 (1922); Louisville, 41–0 (2025)
- Longest win streak: Kentucky, 7 (1912–1994)
- Current win streak: Louisville, 2 (2024–present)

Locations of Kentucky and Louisville

The Governor's Cup is a trophy awarded to the victor of the annual college football game between the University of Kentucky (program started in 1881) and the University of Louisville (program started in 1912) in the commonwealth of Kentucky; it is also used as a reference to the rivalry itself. The annual matchup for the Governor's Cup began in 1994.

== History ==
Although the two teams first met in 1912 – which was also Louisville's inaugural football season – the teams met just six times before the rivalry was suspended after the 1924 season, and it would not be renewed for another 70 years. Despite Louisville's persistent efforts to revive the series, Kentucky showed little interest, according to The Courier-Journal. Kentucky agreed to resume the rivalry only on the condition that the first four games be played in Lexington – a stipulation UofL accepted. The rivalry finally resumed in 1994 with a new Governor's Cup trophy which has been awarded every year since.

Kentucky leads the series 19–17. Since the modern series started in 1994, Louisville leads 17–13. From 1994 to 2006, the game was played on the opening weekend of the college football season. In 2007, the game was moved to the third game of the season when played in Lexington but remained the first game when played in Louisville. Starting in 2014, which marked Louisville's inaugural season in the Atlantic Coast Conference, the Governor's Cup became the last game of the regular season for both teams on Thanksgiving weekend, which coincided with several other ACC-SEC same-state rivalries.

Because the Southeastern Conference, of which Kentucky is a member, decided to play a conference-only schedule for 2020 in response to the COVID-19 pandemic, the 2020 edition of the Governor's Cup game was canceled. The rivalry will continue until at least the 2030 season with Kentucky hosting in even years and Louisville hosting in odd years.

In June 2025, long time Kentucky assistant coach and recruiter Vince Marrow was reported to be leaving the Wildcats to take the general manager position at Louisville in an off-field role. Marrow is considered to be one of the top recruiters in the country and was credited with landing 37 blue chip recruits in his time at Kentucky. The position is expected to include overseeing roster management, high school recruiting, and the transfer portal. The move had been rumored twice before, including in December 2024, but both times Marrow stayed with Kentucky.

In December 2025, following a 41–0 loss to Louisville, Kentucky fired head coach Mark Stoops and hired Will Stein from Oregon. Will Stein is a Louisville native and played QB for the Cardinals from 2008 to 2012, before working as an assistant coach for Louisville in 2013 and 2014. As part of his staff, long time Louisville assistant coach and recruiter Pete Nochta was hired away from Louisville where he worked as the Director of Recruiting. This hiring came just 6 months after Louisville hired Marrow from Kentucky.

=== Notable games ===
September 2, 2000: In the only overtime game in series history, Louisville outlasted Kentucky to win 40–34. A walk-off touchdown from running back Tony Stallings would seal the game for the Cardinals.

November 26, 2016: Kentucky upset #11 Louisville in a shootout. Kentucky recovered a fumble by Heisman candidate Lamar Jackson with 1:45 to go in the game. Kentucky would kick a field goal to win the game 41–38. Lamar Jackson would go on to the win the Heisman Trophy.

November 25, 2023: Kentucky upset #10 Louisville. Louisville entered the game as 7.5 point favorite. This game extended Kentucky's win streak to 5 in a row and 6 of the last 7 meetings. The win was marked by three Louisville turnovers and a kick returned by Kentucky for a touchdown

November 30, 2024: In the 30th game since the series renewal, Louisville dominated Kentucky in a 41–14 win at Kroger Field. The win snapped a 5-game losing streak, giving the Cards their first win in the rivalry since 2017. Louisville forced five turnovers with a fumble returned for a touchdown by Ramon Puryear effectively ending Kentucky's hopes at a comeback.

== Game results ==
Kentucky victories	Louisville victories	Tie games

No.	Date	Location		Score
1	October 26, 1912	Lexington, KY	Kentucky	41–0
2	November 22, 1913	Louisville, KY	Kentucky	20–0
3	November 14, 1914	Lexington, KY	Kentucky	42–0
4	November 6, 1915	Louisville, KY	Kentucky	15–0
5	October 14, 1922	Lexington, KY	Kentucky	73–0
6	October 4, 1924	Lexington, KY	Kentucky	29–0
7	September 3, 1994	Lexington, KY	Kentucky	20–14
8	September 2, 1995	Lexington, KY	Louisville	13–10
9	August 31, 1996	Lexington, KY	Louisville	38–14
10	August 30, 1997	Lexington, KY	Kentucky	38–24
11	September 5, 1998	Louisville, KY	Kentucky	68–34
12	September 4, 1999	Lexington, KY	Louisville	56–28
13	September 2, 2000	Louisville, KY	Louisville	40–34^{OT}
14	September 1, 2001	Lexington, KY	Louisville	36–10
15	September 1, 2002	Louisville, KY	Kentucky	22–17
16	August 31, 2003	Lexington, KY	Louisville	40–24
17	September 5, 2004	Louisville, KY	Louisville	28–0
18	September 4, 2005	Lexington, KY	#12 Louisville	31–24
19	September 3, 2006	Louisville, KY	#13 Louisville	59–28
20	September 15, 2007	Lexington, KY	Kentucky	40–34

No.	Date	Location		Score
21	August 31, 2008	Louisville, KY	Kentucky	27–2
22	September 19, 2009	Lexington, KY	Kentucky	31–27
23	September 4, 2010	Louisville, KY	Kentucky	23–16
24	September 17, 2011	Lexington, KY	Louisville	24–17
25	September 2, 2012	Louisville, KY	#25 Louisville	32–14
26	September 14, 2013	Lexington, KY	#7 Louisville	27–13
27	November 29, 2014	Louisville, KY	#22 Louisville	44–40
28	November 28, 2015	Lexington, KY	Louisville	38–24
29	November 26, 2016	Louisville, KY	Kentucky	41–38
30	November 25, 2017	Lexington, KY	Louisville	44–17
31	November 24, 2018	Louisville, KY	#15 Kentucky	56–10
32	November 30, 2019	Lexington, KY	Kentucky	45–13
33	November 27, 2021	Louisville, KY	Kentucky*	52–21
34	November 26, 2022	Lexington, KY	Kentucky	26–13
35	November 25, 2023	Louisville, KY	Kentucky	38–31
36	November 30, 2024	Lexington, KY	Louisville	41–14
37	November 29, 2025	Louisville, KY	Louisville	41–0
Series: Kentucky leads 19–17
*Kentucky vacated all 2021 wins in August 2024.

=== Results by location ===
As of November 29, 2025

City	Games	Kentucky victories	Louisville victories
Lexington	21	10	11
Louisville	16	9*	6

=== Summary ===
As of November 29, 2025

Years	Games	Kentucky victories	Louisville victories	Score
1912–1924	6	6	0	Kentucky 220 – Louisville 0
1990s	6	3	3	Kentucky 206 – Louisville 179
2000s	10	4	6	Kentucky 263 – Louisville 330
2010s	10	4	6	Kentucky 290 – Louisville 286
2020s	5	2*	2	Kentucky 78 – Louisville 147
Total	37	19*	17	Kentucky 1,057 – Louisville 942

- *Kentucky vacated all 2021 wins in August 2024.

== Coaching records ==
As of November 29, 2025

=== Kentucky ===
Head Coach	Games	Seasons	Wins	Losses	Win %
Mark Stoops	12 (Note: Kentucky vacated all 2021 wins in August 2024.)	2013–2019, 2021–2025 (Note: Kentucky voted with the SEC to not play Louisville in 2020 due to the COVID-19 pandemic.)	5*	6	0.455*
Joker Phillips	3	2010–2012	1	2	0.333
Rich Brooks	7	2003–2009	3	4	0.428
Guy Morriss	2	2001–2002	1	1	0.500
Hal Mumme	4	1997–2000	2	2	0.500
Bill Curry	3	1994–1996	1	2	0.333
Fred J. Murphy	1	1924	1	0	1.000
William Juneau	1	1922	1	0	1.000
John J. Tigert	1	1915	1	0	1.000
Alpha Brumage	2	1913–1914	2	0	1.000
Edwin Sweetland	1	1912	1	0	1.000

=== Louisville ===
Head Coach	Games	Seasons	Wins	Losses	Win %
Jeff Brohm	3	2023–2025	2	1	0.667
Scott Satterfield	3	2019, 2021–2022	0	3	0.000
Lorenzo Ward (Note: The Cardinals were led by interim head coach Lorenzo Ward after Bobby Petrino was fired on November 11.)	1	2018	0	1	0.000
Bobby Petrino	8	2003–2006, 2014–2017	7	1	0.875
Charlie Strong	4	2010–2013	3	1	0.750
Steve Kragthorpe	3	2007–2009	0	3	0.000
John L. Smith	5	1998–2002	3	2	0.600
Ron Cooper	3	1995–1997	2	1	0.667
Howard Schnellenberger	1	1994	0	1	0.000
Fred Enke	1	1924	0	1	0.000
Bill Duncan	1	1922	0	1	0.000
Will Duffy	1	1915	0	1	0.000
Bruce Baker	1	1914	0	1	0.000
Lester Larson	2	1912–1913	0	2	0.000

== Howard Schnellenberger Award ==
The 2010 game was the inaugural year for the award. The award is given to the Most Valuable Player on the winning team by the Louisville Sports Commission. It is named for Howard Schnellenberger, who played under Bear Bryant for Kentucky and was Louisville's head coach when the modern football rivalry began in 1994.

Date	Player	Team	Position	Statistics	References
September 4, 2010	Derrick Locke	Kentucky	RB	23 carries, 104 yards, 2 TDs, 3 receptions, 21 yards; 1 kickoff return, 23 yards	
September 17, 2011	Dexter Heyman	Louisville	LB	12 tackles & 1 forced fumble	
September 2, 2012	Teddy Bridgewater	Louisville	QB	19/21, 232 yards	
September 14, 2013	Teddy Bridgewater	Louisville	QB	16/28, 250 yards, 1 TD	
November 29, 2014	DeVante Parker	Louisville	WR	6 catches, 180 yards, 3 TD	
November 28, 2015	Lamar Jackson	Louisville	QB	8/21, 130 yards, 1 TD; 17 carries, 186 yards, 2 TDs	
November 26, 2016	Stephen Johnson	Kentucky	QB	16/27, 338 yards, 3 TDs; 8 carries, 83 yards	
November 25, 2017	Lamar Jackson	Louisville	QB	15/21, 216 yards, 2 TDs; 18 carries, 156 yards	
November 24, 2018	Terry Wilson	Kentucky	QB	17/23, 261 yards, 3 TDs; 10 carries, 79 yards, 1 TD	
November 30, 2019	Lynn Bowden	Kentucky	QB	1/2, 4 yards; 22 carries, 284 yards, 4 TDs	
November 27, 2021	Will Levis	Kentucky	QB	14/18, 149 yards; 14 carries, 113 yards, 4 TDs	
November 26, 2022	Matt Ruffolo	Kentucky	K	4–4 FG 43 Long, 2–2 PAT	
November 25, 2023	J. J. Weaver	Kentucky	LB	2 fumble recoveries, 8 solo tackles, 1 sack	
November 30, 2024	Isaac Brown	Louisville	RB	26 carries, 178 yards, 2 TDs, 3 receptions, 12 yards	
November 29, 2025	Braxton Jennings	Louisville	RB	20 carries, 113 yards, 5.7 ypc	

== See also ==
- List of NCAA college football rivalry games
- Kentucky–Louisville rivalry
