= Percy Barlow (soccer) =

American soccer player (1905–1981)

Personal information
- Date of birth: 18 June 1905
- Place of birth: Mossley, England
- Date of death: 23 July 1981 (aged 76)
- Place of death: Fall River, Massachusetts
- Position: Forward

Senior career*
Years	Team	Apps	(Gls)
1926–1927	Fall River F.C.	2	(1)
1927–1928	J&P Coats	76	(18)
1929–1930	Pawtucket Rangers	29	(12)
1930	New Bedford Whalers	10	(4)
- * Club domestic league appearances and goals

Percy Barlow (18 June 1905 – 23 July 1981) was a British-born American soccer center forward who played professionally in the American Soccer League.

Barlow was born in England, the son of Fred Barlow and Anna Wood. The family arrived in the United States when he was age 5 and settled in Fall River, Massachusetts, where his father worked in a thread factory. By age 14, Percy was also working in the factory.

In August 1927, Barlow signed with the Fall River F.C. of the American Soccer League. In 1927, he moved to J&P Coats for two seasons. In 1929, the team became the Pawtucket Rangers under new management. In 1930, Barlow played for the New Bedford Whalers.

He died in Fall River in 1981.
