= New York IRT (soccer team) =

New York IRT, also known as IRT F.C., was an early 20th-century American soccer team sponsored by the Interborough Rapid Transit Company.

== History ==
In 1916, the team entered the New York State Association Football League. In 1918, it went to the fourth round of the 1918 National Challenge Cup where it fell to Paterson F.C. In 1919, New York IRT entered the National Association Football League, but withdrew after only five games.

== Year-by-year ==
Year	League	Reg. season	Challenge Cup	American Cup
1916/17	NYSAFL	4th	First round	?
1917/18	NYSAFL	3rd	Third Round	Quarterfinals
1919/20	NAFBL	Withdrew	?	?

== Honors ==
La Sultana Cup

- Winner (2): 1917, 1918

Southern New York Association Cup

- Winner (2): 1917, 1918
