= Thomas Swords =

American soccer player

Tommy Swords
Personal information
- Full name: Thomas Joseph Swords
- Date of birth: October 2, 1885
- Place of birth: Fall River, Massachusetts, United States
- Date of death: March 29, 1953 (aged 67)
- Place of death: Fall River, Massachusetts, United States
- Position: Forward

Senior career*
| Years | Team | Apps | (Gls) |
| 1903 | Whittenton A.C. | | |
| 1904–1909 | Fall River Rovers | | |
| 1910–1912 | Philadelphia Hibernian | | |
| 1913 | New Bedford Whalers | | |
| 1914–1920 | Fall River Rovers | | |

International career
| 1916 | United States | 2 | (0) |
- * Club domestic league appearances and goals

Thomas Swords (October 2, 1885 – March 29, 1953) was an American soccer forward, who served as captain of the U.S. men's national team in its first two games. He is a member of the National Soccer Hall of Fame.

== Club career ==
Swords was born and grew up in Fall River, Massachusetts, US, an early hotbed of U.S. soccer. In 1903, Swords joined Whittenton Athletic Club of Taunton, Massachusetts. After one season, he jumped to his hometown-based Fall River Rovers of the New England League. In 1909, the Rovers won the league title. In 1910, he moved to the Philadelphia Hibernian of the Eastern Soccer League. After two seasons, he moved to the New Bedford Whalers for the 1913 season. However, he was back with the Fall River Rovers in 1914 and would remain with the team until he retired in 1920. During his second stint with the Rovers, Swords experienced some of his greatest achievements when the team went to three consecutive National Challenge Cup finals between 1916 and 1918. In 1916, the team fell to Bethlehem Steel. Then in 1917, they redeemed themselves when they defeated Bethlehem to take the Cup title. The two teams met again in 1918. This time Bethlehem won in a replay after the two teams played to a 2–2 tie in the first game. In this second game, Swords' brutal tackle knocked out the Bethlehem goalkeeper.

== National team ==
In 1916, the United States Football Association (USFA) recruited a team, called the All-American Soccer Football Team, to represent the U.S. on a tour of Scandinavian countries. At the time, these countries and the U.S. were all neutral during the ongoing World War I. Thomas Swords was selected as the team captain. During the six game tour, the U.S. played two recognized international games, one on August 21, 1916, against Sweden and another on September 3, 1916, against Norway. There are disagreements about who scored the first national team goals. The National Soccer Hall of Fame lists Dick Spalding, but other sources state that Swords scored an unassisted goal against Sweden.

He was inducted into the National Soccer Hall of Fame in 1951.
