= Mike McLeavy =

Scottish footballer

Personal information
- Date of birth: 22 July 1900
- Place of birth: Rutherglen, Scotland
- Position: Inside forward

Youth career
- Rutherglen Glencairn

Senior career*
Years	Team	Apps	(Gls)
1921–1922	Falkirk	15	(4)
1922	Kilmarnock	2	(0)
1922–1923	Bo'ness	1	(1)
1923	Vale of Leven	16	(4)
1923–1925	J&P Coats	27	(12)
1925	Providence	7	(0)
1925–1931	New Bedford Whalers	207	(91)
1931	Fall River	6	(4)
1931	New Bedford Whalers	2	(1)
Total		284	(118)
- * Club domestic league appearances and goals

Michael McLeavy (born 22 July 1900) was a Scottish footballer who spent most of his career in the American Soccer League.

In 1921, McLeavy joined Falkirk; he moved to Kilmarnock in 1922 but played only two league games, then played for Bo'ness and Vale of Leven before leaving Scotland for the United States in 1923. When McLeavy arrived, he signed with J&P Coats of the American Soccer League. In 1924, he began the season with J&P Coats, but moved to Providence twelve games into the season. In 1925, McLeavy joined the New Bedford Whalers where he spent most of the rest of his career, aside from six games with the Fall River during the Spring 1931 American Soccer League season.
