= Harry Cooper (soccer) =

American soccer player

Buck Cooper
Personal information
- Date of birth: 1892
- Date of death: January 21, 1963 (aged 70–71)
- Place of death: Newark, New Jersey, United States
- Position: Outside left

Senior career*
Years	Team	Apps	(Gls)
1914	Philadelphia Rangers		
1915	Peabody F.C.		
1916	Continentals		
1916–1917	New York		
1919–1920	Paterson		
1920–1921	Erie A.A.		
1921–1923	New York	16	(1)
1924–1925	Newark Skeeters	3	(0)

International career
1916	United States	2	(1)
- * Club domestic league appearances and goals

Harry "Buck" Cooper was an American soccer player who earned two caps, scoring one goal, with the U.S. national team in 1916. He played in the National Association Football League and American Soccer League.

== International ==
On August 20, 1916, the U.S. national team played its first official international game, a 3–2 victory over Sweden in Sweden. Cooper scored the third U.S. goal in the game in a solo run down the left side. His second, and last, cap came in a 1–1 tie with Norway on September 3, 1916.

== Club career ==
In 1914, Cooper played for the Philadelphia Ranger. In 1915, he played for Peabody F.C. in Philadelphia. Peabody released him on January 7, 1916, when the team disbanded. He then moved to Continentals F.C. of the New York State Amateur Foot Ball League. That year, he moved to the New York Field Club in the semi-professional National Association Football League. By 1919, he was with Paterson. In 1920, he moved to Erie A.A. for one season. In 1921, New York F.C. became an inaugural member of the professional American Soccer League and Cooper rejoined the team for two seasons. He also played for the Newark Skeeters during the 1924-25 American Soccer League season.
