= 1895–96 American Cup =

Soccer tournament

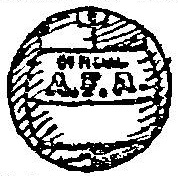

Tournament details
- Country: United States
- Teams: 13

Final positions
- Champions: True Blues (1st title)
- Runners-up: Olympics

Tournament statistics
- Matches played: 16
- Goals scored: 92 (5.75 per match)

The 1895–96 American Cup was the twelfth edition of the soccer tournament organized by the American Football Association. The 1894 Runners Up, Paterson True Blues, won the tournament after defeating the two-time champions Fall River Olympics in the final. This season the elected committee was James C. Potter of Pawtucket as president, James Turner of Paterson as vice president, William Robertson of Newark as Secretary, and Andrew Meiklejohn of Pawtucket as Treasurer.

== Participants ==
Division	State	City	Team
Western	New Jersey	Kearny	Kearny Caledonians
Western	New Jersey	Kearny	Kearny Rangers
Western	New Jersey	Newark	Scottish-American (NAFBL)
Western	New Jersey	Paterson	Paterson Thistle
Western	New Jersey	Paterson	Paterson True Blues
Western	New York	New York	International A.C. (NAFBL)
Western	New York	New York	New York Thistle
Eastern	Connecticut	Taftville	Taftville
Eastern	Massachusetts	Fall River	Fall River East Ends (NEL)
Eastern	Massachusetts	Fall River	Fall River Olympics (NEL)
Eastern	Massachusetts	Fall River	Fall River Rovers (NEL)
Eastern	Rhode Island	Pawtucket	Pawtucket Free Wanderers (NEL)
Eastern	Rhode Island	Pawtucket	Young Men's Christian Association (NEL)

== First round ==
The first round draw took place at the AFA meeting at Newark, New Jersey on September 21, 1895. The True Blues had a bye. The Rover-East End match was ordered replayed because of unregistered players and it was played with 30 minute halves.

November 1895	Caledonians	–	NY Thistle	Kearny, NJ
2:30 PM				Stadium: Cosmopolitan Park
Note: Caledonians: GK J.Hopkins, FB G.Winters, W.Mortimer, HB R.Swithemby, J.McCance, A.Cutler, FW P.Cooper, R.Taylor, J.Nagle, D.Douglas, H.Singleton.

November 2, 1895	Scottish-Americans	1–1	Rangers	Newark, NJ
				Stadium: Wiedenmayer's Park

November 2, 1895	Olympics	7–2	Taftville	Fall River, MA
3:00 PM	Borden 1',, Blake, Miller,		W.Brown; Nelson 5'	Stadium: Olympic grounds Attendance: 200; Referee: A. Adams (Pawtucket)
Note: Olympics: GK Irving, FB Fortin, Lagrosse, HB Hayes, Drouge, Jean, RW Miller, Demille, LW Borden, Sunderland, C P.Farrell. Reserves Bright, Leveque. Taftville: G J.Brown, FB Gamble, Catterall, HB Baldwin, Wood, Ferguson, RW Smith, Montgomery, LW Nelson, Muttlewain, C W.Brown.

November 9, 1895	International	8–1	Paterson Thistle	Jersey City, NJ
	W.Jones, J.Jones, Salter, Taylor,		Goal	Stadium: Communipaw grounds

November 9, 1895	Rovers	4–1	East Ends	Fall River, MA
3:50 PM	Gigerette 5',, (2H)		(1H)	Stadium: Bedford Street grounds Attendance: 200; Referee: T. Abbott (Olympics)
Note: Rovers: GK Simister, FB Fagin, Harry Adams, HB Hancock, Robert Pickup, J.Stanton, RW Lord, Tobin, LW Savaugh, Gigerette, C Cummings. East Ends: GK Brady, FB Jennings, S.Jenkins, HB Lonsdale, Pat Stanton, Beattie, RW Colligan, Pearson, LW Sullivan, Murphy, C Tom Stanton.

November 9, 1895	Free Wanderers	1–1	Y.M.C.A.	Pawtucket, RI
3:05 PM	R.Davis 5'		A.Watson 25'	Stadium: Dexter Street grounds Attendance: 700; Referee: Whittle (Fall River)
Note: Free Wanderers: GK Hanaway, FB T.Davis, Whipple, HB Walmsley, Read, Adams, RW Hutchinson, Richard Davis, LW Hunt, James, C Lyons. Y.M.C.A.: GK McFarlane, FB F.Watson, Paterson, HB Schora, Meiklejohn, McLay, RW Wilde, McNeil, LW Malone, Moore, C A.Watson.

=== replays ===
November 9, 1895	Rangers	1–0	Scottish-Americans	Newark, NJ
	Goal			Stadium: Cosmopolitan Park

November 28, 1895	Free Wanderers	5–3	Y.M.C.A.	Pawtucket, RI
10:00 AM	James 8', (1H); Kirkham 70'; Davis		Morrison 25' (2H)	Stadium: Dexter Street grounds Attendance: 1500; Referee: Pickup (Fall River)
Note: Free Wanderers: GK Hanaway, FB Walmsley, Whipple, HB Hunt, Read, Adams, RW Hutchinson, Smith, LW Davis, James, C Kirkham. Y.M.C.A.: GK McFarlane, FB F.Watson, Paterson, HB Schora, Meiklejohn, McLay, RW Wilde, McNeil, LW Malone, Morrison, C A.Watson.

November 28, 1895	Rovers	5–5	East Ends	Fall River, MA
			T.Stanton; Smith	Stadium: Rovers grounds Referee: Sunderland
Note: Rovers: GK Dennis Shea, FB Fagan, Hancock, HB Eccles, Pickup, J.Stanton, LW Hughes, Bannister, RW Lord, Melia, C Giguerette. East Ends: GK Brady, FB Jennings, S.Jenkins, HB Burns, Pat Stanton, John Haywood, LW Murphy, Smith, RW Hargraves, Culligan, C Tom Stanton.

January 4, 1895	East Ends	0–5	Rovers	Fall River, MA
2:45 PM			Tobin 10' (2H); Pemberton 15' (1H); Simister (2H)	Stadium: County street grounds Referee: A. Pilling
Note: Rovers: GK Dennis Shea, FB Ormonde, Murphy, HB Eccles, Pickup, J.Stanton, LW Hancock, Tobin, RW Lord, Simister, C Pemberton. East Ends: GK Brady, FB Jennings, S.Jenkins, HB Beattie, Pat Stanton, John Heywood, LW Pearson, Green, RW Culligan, Greenwood, C Tom Stanton.

== Second round ==
The Rovers drew a second round bye. The True Blue-Caledonian match was protested and ordered replayed.

December 25, 1895	Free Wanderers	2–7	Olympics	Pawtucket, RI
2:45 PM	Hutchinson 12'; 2H' R.Davis (2H)		Miller 13'; Hanaway (o.g.); Borden 24'; Demille (1H); 53'	Stadium: Dexter street grounds Attendance: 600; Referee: Alexander Meiklejohn (Y.M.C.A.)
Note: Olympics: GK Irving, FB Fortin, Legrosse, HB Hayes, Drouge, Jean, RW Miller, Demille, LW Borden, Sunderland, C P.Farrell. Reserves W.Blake, O.H.Bennett, I.Greenwood. Free Wanderers: GK Hanaway, FB T.Davis, Whipple, HB Walmsley, Read, Adams, RW Hutchinson, Hunt, LW R.Davis, James, C Jenkins.

December 28, 1895	Rangers	1–4	International	Kearny, NJ
3:00 PM	Marshall 3'		Jamieson, Jones; Murphy	Stadium: Cosmopolitan Park; Attendance: 2500; Referee: T. MacIntosh
Note: International: GK Hayes, FB R.Sanson, Allen, HB Slack, Partington, Cutler, LW Hood, Douglass, C H.Sanson, RW Marshall, McGee. Rangers: GK Dunning, FB Flynn, Holmes, HB Kimberlin, Taylor, Stubbs, LW Murphy, Stubbs, C Jamieson, RW Jones, Higgins.

December 28, 1895	True Blues	4–1	Caledonians	Lakeview, NJ
2:45 PM	Spencer (1H); Turner (1H)		(1H)	Stadium: Olympic Park; Referee: A. Gray (Weehawken)
Note: True Blues: GK Fred Allen, FB W.Alexander, H.McCrowe, HB R.Hall, G.Eaton, J.Upton, FW E.Grewcock, J.O'Neil, Robert Spencer, Harry Lander, Tommie Turner. Caledonians: GK Glynn, FB McCance, Dave Wilson, HB Swithemby, Morton, Singleton, FW Kelly, Philbin, Nagle, Burns, Brown.

=== replay ===
January 18, 1896	True Blues	5–1	Caledonians	Lakeview, NJ
2:45 PM	15' (1H),, (2H)		(2H)	Stadium: Olympic Park; Attendance: 2000; Referee: William Turner
Note: True Blues: GK Fred Allen, FB W.Alexander, H.McCrowe, HB R.Hall, G.Eaton, J.Upton, FW E.Grewcock, J.Oldfield, Robert Spencer, Harry Lander, Tommie Turner. Caledonians: GK Wilkie, FB J.Wilson, W.Mortimer, HB J.McCance, W.Morton, H.Singleton, FW P.Cooper, G.Govern, J.Nagle, A.Burns, J.Kerr.

== Semifinals ==
February 22, 1896	True Blues	3–1	International	Lakeview, NJ
3:30 PM	Spencer 55'; Lauder (2H); Grewcock (2H)		Grundy (1H)	Stadium: Olympic Park; Attendance: 3000; Referee: J. Lennox (Kearny Rangers)
Note: True Blues: GK Fred Allen, FB W.Alexander, H.McCrowe, HB R.Hall, G.Eaton, J.Upton, RW E.Grewcock(c), J.Oldfield, C Robert Spencer, LW Harry Lauder, Tommie Turner. International: GK Hopkins, FB Walker, Patrick, HB R.Taylor, Stubbs, Jones, LW Grundy, Saulter, C Young, RW J.Taylor, O'Donnell.

February 22, 1896	Olympics	2–1	Rovers	Fall River, MA
3:00 PM	Demille 10'; Farrell 65'		Bannister 25'	Stadium: Olympic grounds Attendance: 500; Referee: Abe Pilling
Note: Olympics: GK Irving, FB Fortin, Legrosse, HB Hayes, Drouge, Jean, RW Miller, Demille, LW Borden, Sunderland, C P.Farrell. Rovers: GK Simister, FB Cunliffe, Hughes, HB Hancock, Pickup, J.Stanton, LW Bannister, M.Harrington, RW Lord, J.Farrell, C Pemberton.

== Final ==
The Olympics entered the final undefeated in all competitions up to that point with 68 goals scored to 10 against. They won the New England League as well as the Mayor's Cup series. The True Blues had only two losses in 21 games scoring 103 goals to 26 against.

April 18, 1896	True Blues	7–2	Olympics	Kearny, NJ
3:30 PM	Spencer 9' (1H); Turner; Lauder 45'; Oldfield 65', Grewcock 89'		Sunderland (1H), 87'	Stadium: Cosmopolitan Park; Attendance: 1500; Referee: James Lennox (Newark)
Note: True Blues: GK J.McKay, FB W.Alexander, R.Watson, HB R.Hall, George Eaton, J.Upton, RW E.Grewcock(c), James Oldfield, C Robert Spencer, LW Harry Lauder, Thomas Turner. Olympics: GK James Irving, FB Peter C. Fortin, Joseph Legrosse, HB Timothy Hayes, Francis Drouge, Frederick Jean, RW William Miller, Joseph Demille, LW Ernest Borden, John Sunderland, C Patrick Farrell.

== Champions ==
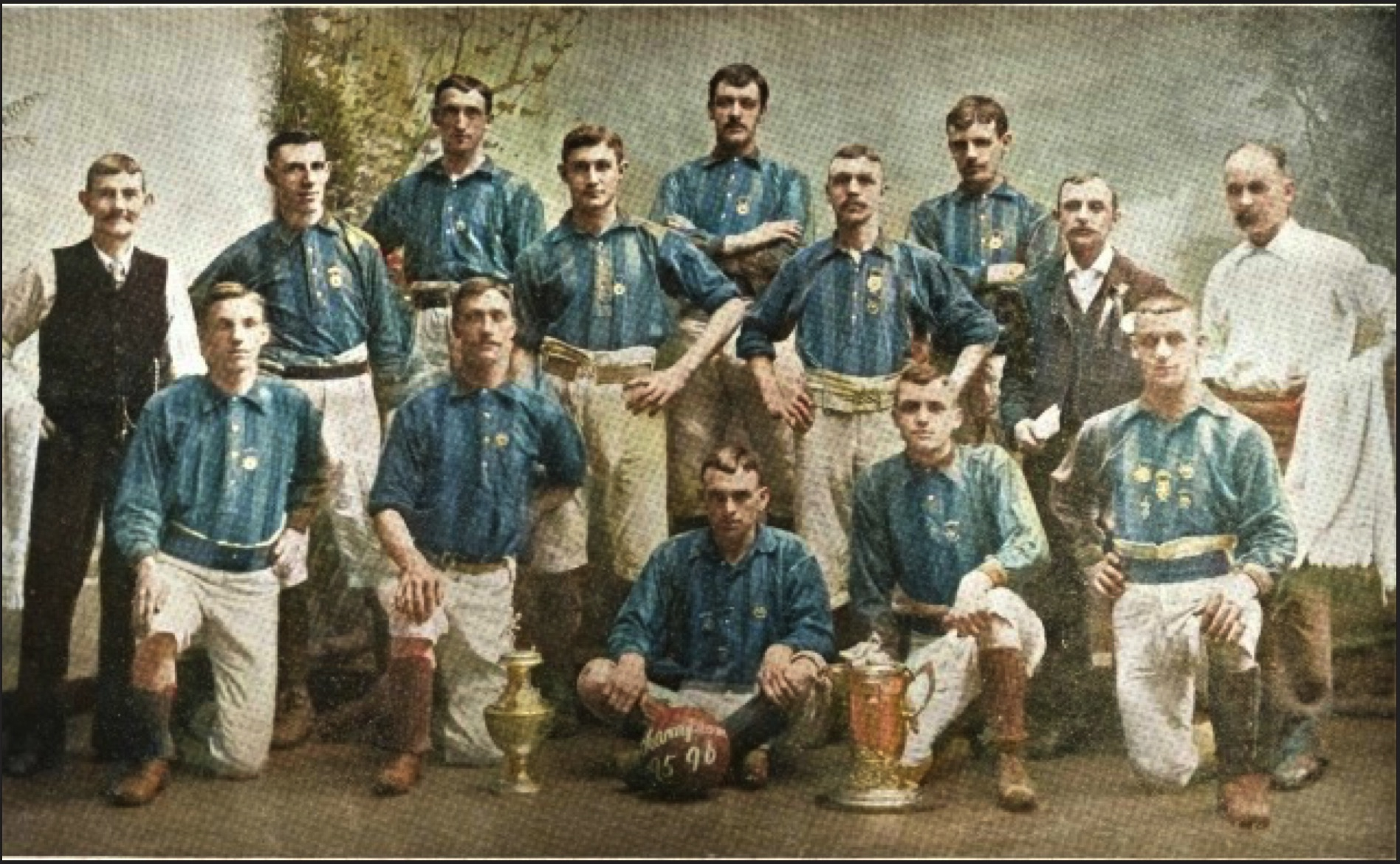
Standing: Thomas Petty (Trainer), R. Hall, W. Alexander, George Eaton, J. McKay, J. Upton, R. Watson, Herbert Newton (Manager), H. Hill (Trainer). Kneeling: James Oldfield, E. Grewcock (Captain), Robert Spencer, Harry W. Lauder, Thomas Turner.

== American Cup bracket ==
First Round	Second Round
(New Jersey)	Paterson True Blues
bye
(New Jersey)	Paterson True Blues	4–5
(New Jersey)	Kearny Caledonians	1–1
(New Jersey)	Kearny Caldonians	w/o
(New York (state))	New York Thistle
Western Circuit
(New Jersey)	Scottish-American	1–0
(New Jersey)	Kearny Rangers	1–1
(New Jersey)	Kearny Rangers	1
(New York (state))	International A.C.	4
(New York (state))	International A.C.	8
(New Jersey)	Paterson Thistle	1
(Rhode Island)	Pawtucket Free Wanderers	1–5
(Rhode Island)	Y.M.C.A	1–3
(Rhode Island)	Pawtucket Free Wanderers	2
(Massachusetts)	Fall River Olympics	7
(Massachusetts)	Fall River Olympics	7
(Connecticut)	Taftville	2
Eastern Circuit
(Massachusetts)	Fall River Rovers	4–5–5
(Massachusetts)	Fall River East Ends	1–5–0
(Massachusetts)	Fall River Rovers
bye

Semifinals
(New Jersey)	Paterson True Blues	3
(New York (state))	International A.C.	1
(Massachusetts)	Fall River Olympic	2
(Massachusetts)	Fall River Rovers	1

Finals
(New Jersey)	Paterson True Blues	7
(Massachusetts)	Fall River Olympics	2

== See also ==
1895–96 National Association Foot Ball League season
