= 1892–93 American Cup =

Soccer tournament

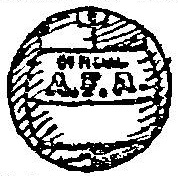

Tournament details
- Country: United States
- Teams: 19

Final positions
- Champions: Free Wanderers (1st title)
- Runners-up: NY Thistle

Tournament statistics
- Matches played: 13
- Goals scored: 68 (5.23 per match)

The 1892–93 American Cup was the ninth edition of the soccer tournament organized by the American Football Association. The Pawtucket Free Wanderers won their first title by overcoming the New York Thistles in the final. This season operations shifted to New England with the elected committee represented by John Clark of Pawtucket as president, Joseph Brady of the East Ends as vice president, John F. Geagan of the Rovers as Secretary, and Ephraim Mayes of the Olympics as Treasurer.

== Entrants ==
Section	State	City	Team
Western	New Jersey	Bayonne	Bayonne Rovers
Western	New Jersey	Kearny	Young Men's Christian Union
Western	New Jersey	Kearny	Stars
Western	New Jersey	Newark	Newark Caledonians
Western	New Jersey	Paterson	Paterson True Blues
Western	New Jersey	Paterson	Thistle
Western	New York	New York	New York Thistles
Eastern	Massachusetts	Fall River	Clippers
Eastern	Massachusetts	Fall River	Canonicuts
Eastern	Massachusetts	Fall River	Fall River East Ends
Eastern	Massachusetts	Fall River	Fall River Olympics
Eastern	Massachusetts	Fall River	Fall River Rovers
Eastern	Massachusetts	New Bedford	New Bedford Rovers
Eastern	Rhode Island	Manville	Manville Athletics
Eastern	Rhode Island	Pawtucket	Pawtucket Free Wanderers
Eastern	Rhode Island	Pawtucket	Pawtucket Thistles
Eastern	Rhode Island	Providence	Gorhams
Eastern	Rhode Island	Thornton	British Hosiery
Eastern	Vermont	Barre	Barre Rangers

== First round ==
The first round draw took place at the AFA meeting at the Wilbur House in Fall River, Massachusetts on August 21, 1892. The games of the first round were scheduled to be played on or before the second Saturday in November.

Olympics	w/o	British Hosiery
Note: British Hosiery forfeited not having registered their players on time.

October 29, 1892	Stars	1–3	Paterson Thistle	Kearny, NJ

Conanicuts	–	Manvilles
Note: Both teams withdrew.

November 5, 1892	Free Wanderers	3–1	East Ends	Pawtucket, RI
3:30 PM	36'; Davis 42'; Watson 80'		Pemberton 30'	Stadium: Dexter street grounds Attendance: 5000; Referee: Thomas Bruckshaw
Note: Free Wanderers: G Shea, FB Gregory, Jack Stuart, HB Reed, Johnson, Sam Jenkins, RW Jeffrey, Davis, LW Slater, Watson, C Al Jenkins. East Ends: G James Irving, FB George Morris, Bernard Fagan, HB James Hughes, Thomas Philbin, Fred Scott, LW Ernest Borden, John Sunderland, RW John Tobin, Henry Farrell, C James Pemberton.

November 5, 1892	Gorhams	2–6	Fall River Rovers	Fall River, MA
	(2H) (2H)		1'; 6' (1H) (1H) (1H); Barlow (2H)	Stadium: Rover grounds Attendance: 500; Referee: Bell
Note: Gorhams: GK McFarlane, FB Muirhead, Greyhurst, HB McConnell, Bennett, Fanning, LW Greene, O'Neil, C Buck, RW Montgomery, Robertson. Rovers: GK McGuigan, FB Buckley, Culligan, HB Barlow, Pickup, Burgess, LW Kenney, Bannister, C Smith, RW Randall, Schofield.

November 5, 1892	NY Thistle	5–0	Caledonians	Paterson, NJ
				Stadium: Recreation grounds

November 5, 1892	Y.M.C.U.	4–2	True Blues	Kearny, NJ
	(1H), (1H), (1H); Cutler (2H)		(2H), (2H)

November 12, 1892	Rangers	w/o	Pawtucket Thistle
Note: Pawtucket Thistle withdrew.

December 3, 1892	Clippers	0–2	New Bedford Rovers	New Bedford, MA
3:15 PM			Taylor 65'; Culbert	Stadium: Cove Street grounds Referee: Phalen and Bennett
Note: Clippers: GK Sullivan, FB Melville, Smith, HB P. Knowe, Callery, Coggeshall, LW Horsefall, F. Swan, C F. Knowe, RW J.Sullivan, J.Swan. Rovers: GK Crowley, FB Finian, Seddon, HB O'Rourke, Lyons, Beattie, LW Taylor, Cartmill, C Reed, RW Duckworth, Calbert.

== Second round ==
The second round draw took place at the AFA meeting in the St. Charles Hotel in Pawtucket, Rhode Island on November 19, 1892. The games of the second round were scheduled to be played on or before the second Saturday in January. The Olympics drew a bye.

December 26, 1892	Y.M.C.U.	2–5	NY Thistle	Kearny, NJ
3:30 PM				Stadium: Athletic grounds Attendance: 500; Referee: R. McDonald

Rangers	–	Fall River Rovers

Paterson Thistle	w/o	Bayonne Rovers
Note: The teams met on February 18 at the Recreation grounds in Haledon, however no referee showed up. Given that there was also heavy snow on the grounds, the teams agreed to play a friendly match, Paterson winning 4–0. Bayonne eventually cancelled allowing Paterson to advance.

March 25, 1893	Free Wanderers	11–1	New Bedford Rovers	Pawtucket, RI
3:30 PM				Stadium: Dexter Street grounds Attendance: 800; Referee: Mr. Hunt
Note: Free Wanderers: G Shea, FB Gregory, Jack Stuart, HB Reed, Jeffrey, Sam Jenkins, RW Whiteside, Davis, LW Slater, Watson, C Al Jenkins. Rovers: GK Cunningham, FB Finlan, Seddon, HB O'Rourke, Lyons, Beattie, LW Welsh, Cartmill, C James Reed, RW W.Brierly, Woolley.

== Third round ==
March 25, 1893	Olympics	0–2	Fall River Rovers	Fall River, MA
4:00 PM			Gavin (2H); Bannister (2H)	Stadium: Olympic grounds Attendance: 5000; Referee: John Tobin (East Ends)
Note: Olympics: GK Farrell, FB Lee, Spencer, HB Lagrosse, Morris, Fortin, LW Taylor, Leveque, C Wilde, RW Cunliffe, Tomlinson. Rovers: GK Murtaugh, FB Culligan, Buckley, HB Pickup, Whittaker, Barlow, LW Kenny, Bannister, C M.Harrington, RW Randall, Gavin.

== Semifinals ==
March 25, 1893	Paterson Thistle	3–3	NY Thistle	Paterson , NJ
3:00 PM	McAuley 4'			Stadium: Haledon grounds Referee: Robert McDonald
Note: Paterson: GK, FB T. McAuley, T. Turner(c), HB McIzatt, S. Findley, E. Ackerman, LW Ingram, J. Turner, C Morton, RW Wilson, M. McAuley.

April 22, 1893	Fall River Rovers	1–4	Free Wanderers	Fall River, MA
3:00 PM	Randall		Jeffrey 25', Al Jenkins,	Stadium: Rovers' grounds Referee: James Hood (Newark, NJ)
Note: Rovers: GK Murtaugh, FB Culligan, Buckley, HB Pickup, Whittaker, Barlow, LW Kenny, Bannister, C Mike Harrington, RW Randall, Gavan. Free Wanderers: GK Shea, FB Gregory, Jack Stuart, HB Reed, Johnson, Sam Jenkins, RW Jeffrey, Davis, LW Slater, Watson, C Al Jenkins.

=== replay ===
April 7, 1893	Paterson Thistle	1–4	NY Thistle	Paterson , NJ
	(1H)		(2H), (2H), (2H), (2H)	Stadium: Haledon Athletic grounds

== Final ==
The New York Thistles, the previous year's runner up, entered the final undefeated in the season with 17 wins and two tie games, boasting 123 goals scored and 15 against. The Pawtucket Free Wanderers, along with making their first American Cup final appearance, had won the New England League three weeks prior, finishing in first ahead of the East Ends, Olympics, Rovers, and Clippers of Fall River and the New Bedford Rovers.

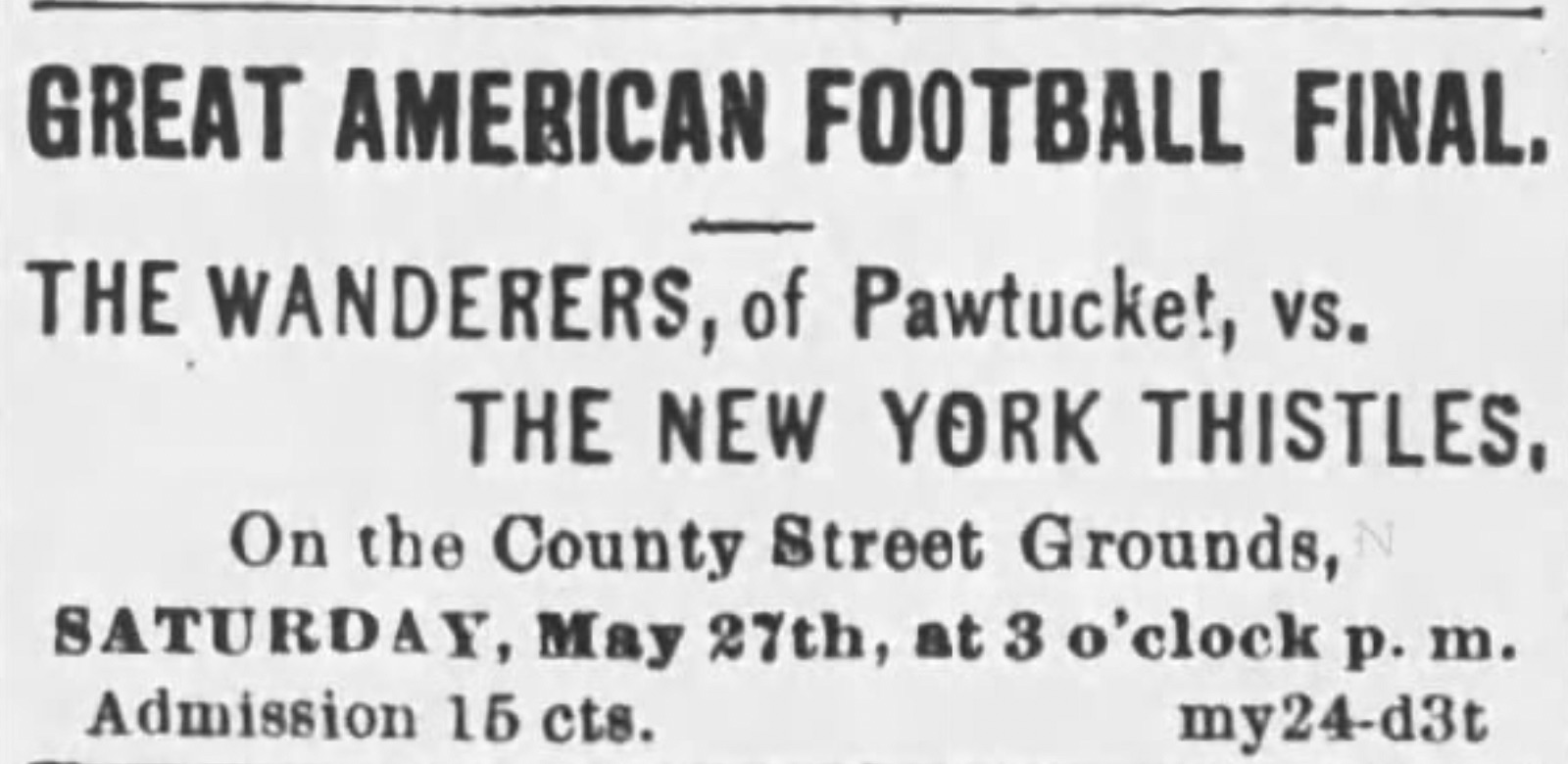
Ad for PFW v NYT Final

May 27, 1893	Free Wanderers	3–1	NY Thistle	Fall River, MA
3:00 PM	Slater; A.Jenkins; Jeffrey		McKinley	Stadium: County street grounds Attendance: 3000; Referee: Henry Waring
Note: Free Wanderers: GK Shea, FB Gregory, Jack Stuart, HB Reed, Johnson, Sam Jenkins, RW Jeffrey, Davis, LW Slater, Watson, C Al Jenkins. Thistle: GK Armstrong, FB Patrick, Foy, HB Adam, Entwistle, Willie, RW Jameson, McConnell, LW McGee, McKinley, C McGovern.

== American Cup bracket ==
First Round
(Massachusetts)	Fall River Olympics	w/o
(Rhode Island)	British Hosiery
(Vermont)	Barre Rangers	w/o
(Rhode Island)	Pawtucket Thistle
(Rhode Island)	Gorhams	2
(Massachusetts)	Fall River Rovers	6
Eastern Circuit
(Rhode Island)	Pawtucket Free Wanders	3
(Massachusetts)	Fall River East Ends	1
(Massachusetts)	Fall River Clippers	0
(Massachusetts)	New Bedford Rovers	2
(Massachusetts)	~~Canonicuts~~	(Note: Both teams withdrew from competition)
(Rhode Island)	~~Manville Athletics~~
(New Jersey)	Kearny Stars	1
(New Jersey)	Paterson Thistle	3
(New Jersey)	Bayonne Rovers
bye
Western Circuit
(New Jersey)	Y.M.C.U	4
(New Jersey)	Paterson True Blues	2
(New York (state))	New York Thistle	5
(New Jersey)	Newark Caledonians	0

Second Round
(Massachusetts)	Fall River Olympics
bye
(Vermont)	Barre Rangers
(Massachusetts)	Fall River Rovers	w/o
(Rhode Island)	Pawtucket Free Wanderers	11
(Massachusetts)	New Bedford Rovers	1
(New Jersey)	Paterson Thistle	w/o
(New Jersey)	Bayonne Rovers
(New Jersey)	Y.M.C.U	2
(New York (state))	New York Thistle	5

Third Round
(Massachusetts)	Fall River Olympics	0
(Massachusetts)	Fall River Rovers	2
(Rhode Island)	Pawtucket Free Wanderers
bye
(New Jersey)	Paterson Thistle
bye
(New York (state))	New York Thistle
bye

Semifinals
(Massachusetts)	Fall River Rovers	1
(Rhode Island)	Pawtucket Free Wanderers	4
(New Jersey)	Paterson Thistle	3–1
(New York (state))	New York Thistle	3–4

Finals
(Rhode Island)	Pawtucket Free Wanders	3
(New York (state))	New York Thistle	1
