= 1920–21 American Cup =

Soccer tournament

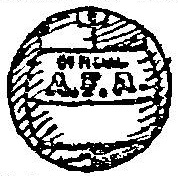

Tournament details
- Country: United States
- Dates: October 1920 – May 1921
- Teams: 44

Final positions
- Champions: Robins Dry Dock (2nd title)
- Runners-up: Bethlehem Steel Works

The 1920–21 American Cup was the annual challenge cup held by the American Football Association. The annual meeting to elect officials was held at the Hotel Berwick in Newark on September 18, 1920. The A.F.A. officials elected were president Donald MacMillan of East Newark, vice–president William Patrick of Bayonne, recording secretary James Galletley of Kearny, and secretary/treasurer Andrew N. Beveridge of Jersey City. Entries for the tournament were due to close by September 20. Robins Dry Dock of Brooklyn recorded their second triumph of the American trophy in consecutive seasons. The shipbuilders defeated the steelworkers 1–0 in the final on May 2 at Harrison, New Jersey.

== First round ==
The first and second round draw took place October 2, 1920 at Hotel Berwick in Newark, NJ. Matches were to be played by October 24. The following teams drew byes: Ansonia, Bethlehem Steel, Brooklyn, Chicopee Rovers, Clan Cameron (Providence), Clan MacDuff (New York), Columbia Graphaphone, Disston (Tacony), Erie, Farr & Alpaca, Greystone, General Electric (Lynn), Hibernian (Philadelphia), J. & J. Dobson, New Departure (Bristol), New York, Robins Dry Dock, Swedish Athletics, Tebo Yacht, and West Orange.

Pennsylvania District
No games

New Jersey District

October 24, 1920

Paterson	6–1	Erie Juniors
Galloway (2); Petrie; Burns; Vanden Eyden; Illingsworth		McCarten

Olympic Park, Paterson, NJ
Referee: Dunn
October 24, 1920

Crescent	2–3	Babcock & Wilcox
		89' Elliott (pk)

Clark's Field, East Newark
October 24, 1920

Sprague	1–2	Athenia Steel Company

Bloomfield, NJ
October 24, 1920

Federal Ship	8–1	Bunker Hill
Richardson (4); S. Jamieson; M. Jamieson (2); Field		Gleason

Clark's Field, East Newark

New York District

October 24, 1920

Greenpoint	3–2	Viking
Gillespie; Harrington

Greenpoint, NY

Connecticut District

October 24, 1920

Stamford	1–2	Danersk Athletic
2H'		1H'; 80'

Halloween Park, Stamford, CT
Referee: Joe Booth (Bridgeport)
October 24, 1920

Connecticut Lace Works	0–5	Waverly

Malone Lot, Norwalk, CT
Attendance: 250

North Massachusetts District

October 23, 1920

Hendee Indians	1–3	Fore River
89' Earnest Logan (pk)		5' Black (pk); 10' Dave Page; Jack Kershaw

League Park, Springfield, MA
Referee: D. Cruickshanks

New England District

October 23, 1920

Fall River Rovers	3–0	St. Michael's
		65' Hodson; Lynch; 86' Parker

Athletic grounds, Fall River, MA
Attendance: 3000
Referee: Joe Smith
October 23, 1920

Potter Johnston	1–8	J. & P. Coats
85' Cookson		Holgate (5); Bob Millar; Al Lonie; McIntosh

Lonsdale Ave grounds, Pawtucket
Referee: Pemberton
October 23, 1920

Sayles Finishing Plant	2–2	Ashton Berkeley
Cunliffe; Downie		Williams; Slater

Berkeley Oval
Referee: Jones
October 30, 1920

Crompton	1–3	Fairlawn Rovers
2H'		Roger Smith (pk); 1H' Roger Smith; Bobby Bowes

Crompton, RI
Referee: Armitage

replay

November 7, 1920

Sayles Finishing Plant	6–0	Ashton Berkeley

Berkeley Oval

== Second round ==
The second round matches were due to be played on or before November 14. The Hibernian vs Disston game was forfeited by Disston for lack of players. The match was played as a friendly.

New Jersey District

November 14, 1920

Paterson	0–4	Erie
		25', 40' Heminsley; Brown; Archie Stark

Olympic Park, Paterson, NJ
Attendance: 3000
Referee: J. Muirhead
November 14, 1920

Babcock & Wilcox	5–0	West Orange

B&W grounds, Bayonne, NJ
Referee: W. Rawley
November 14, 1920

Federal Ship	9–0	Athenia Steel
Richardson (3); Brierley (2); Mauncher; M. Jamieson; Field; S. Jamieson

Jersey City Ball Park
Referee: D. Bell

New York District

November 14, 1920

New York	2–0	Clan MacDuff
67', 82' Hardy

New York Oval
Referee: J. Schoelfield
November 14, 1920

Robins Dry Dock	2–1	Tebo Yacht Basin
28' Ratican; 35' Clarke		25' Mitchell

Todd Field, Brooklyn
Referee: W. Williams
November 14, 1920

Greenpoint	1–1	Brooklyn

McGoldrick Field, Greenpoint

replay

November 21, 1920

Greenpoint	0–2	Brooklyn
		7', 67' Bulcock

Ridgewood Baseball grounds

Connecticut District

November 14, 1920

Swedish	1–3	Ansonia
		Speed

The Meadows, Bridgeport, CT
Referee: R. McRae
November 14, 1920

Waverley	5–3	Danersk Athletic
47' Art Greenslade; 69' Tommy Grey; 87' Adams

New Haven, CT
November 14, 1920

Columbia Graphophone	w/o	New Departure

Bridgeport, CT

Northern Massachusetts district

November 13, 1920

General Electric	3–1	Farr Alpaca
20' McKay; 43' Johnny Kane; 85' Dundas		2H' Dowdall

Hibs Field, Lynn, MA
Referee: P. Carrigan (Boston)
November 13, 1920

Fore River	7–0	Chicopee Rovers
2' Joe Kershaw; Jack Kershaw (4); Law; Shepard

Quincy, MA
Referee: A. Catto (Quincy)

Southern New England district

November 9, 1920

Fairlawn Rovers	4–0	Greystone
Ward (2); McDonald (2)

Clark's Field, East Newark
Referee: Charles Pierson
November 13, 1920

J. & P. Coats	3–2	Sayles
10' Louie; 47' Miller; Holgate		1H', 89' Downie

Lonsdale Ave grounds, Pawtucket
Referee: Carlin
November 20, 1920

Fall River Rovers	14–0	Clan Cameron
Connie Lynch (4); Tommy Adams (3); Pilkington (2); Parker (2); Morgan (2); Bouchard

Athletic grounds, Fall River, MA
Referee: Norse (New Bedford)

Pennsylvania district

November 27, 1920

Hibernian	w/o	Disston

Cahill Field, Philadelphia, PA
December 4, 1920

J. & J. Dobson	1–1	Bethlehem Steel
85' Bergen		Brittan

Philadelphia, PA
Referee: Robert Scott

replay

December 11, 1920

Bethlehem Steel	6–0	J. & J. Dobson

Bethlehem, PA

== Third round ==
The third round matches were due to be played on or before December 5. Columbia Graphophone was awarded their game against Waverley by the referee due to player misconduct. The Robins vs. New York match was protested and ordered replayed.

New Jersey and New York District

December 5, 1920

Federal Ship	2–4	Erie
20' W. Jamieson; 70' Fielder		30' Knowles; 65' Heminsley; 80' Ford; Knowles

Harrison Field
Attendance: 3000
Referee: T. Cunningham
December 5, 1920

New York	0–1	Robins Dry Dock
		82' Irvine

New York Oval
Attendance: 3000
Referee: J. Schofield
December 5, 1920

Babcock & Wilcox	–	Brooklyn

Bayonne, NJ

replay

December 12, 1920

New York	1–3	Robins Dry Dock
20' Sam McDonald		10' Page; 30' Ratican; 40' Hosie

New York Oval
Attendance: 4000
Referee: J. Schofield

Southern New England district

December 4, 1920

Fairlawn Rovers	0–1	J. & P. Coats
		44' Lonie (pk)

Lindsey Field, Fairlawn
Referee: Norse (New Bedford)
December 5, 1920

Columbia Graphophone	w/o	Waverley

Bridgeport, CT
Referee: G. Denholm
December 11, 1920

Fall River Rovers	7–1	Ansonia
Connie Lynch (2); Parker (3); Pilkington (2)		80' Beaton

Athletic grounds, Fall River, MA
Referee: Smith

Northern Massachusetts district

December 11, 1920

Fore River	6–0	General Electric
8' David Page; 13', 2H' Fred Churchley; Law (2); Shepard

Quincy, MA
Referee: W. Hulse (Lawrence)

Pennsylvania district

December 18, 1920

Hibernian	0–3	Bethlehem Steel
		47' Wilson; Forrest (2)

Cahill Field, Philadelphia, PA
Referee: James Walders (Philadelphia)

== Fourth round ==
The fourth round matches were due to be played on or before December 26.

January 1, 1921

Bethlehem Steel	0–1	Robins Dry Dock
		44' Sturch

Bethlehem, PA
Attendance: 2000
Referee: George Young (Philadelphia)
January 1, 1921

J. & P. Coats	0–1	Fore River
		5' Shepherd

Coats Field, Pawtucket, RI
Attendance: 1800
Referee: Norse (New Bedford)
January 2, 1921

Erie	4–0	Babcock & Wilcox
Koelsch; 25' Heminsley; 75' Archie Stark; 85' Davy Brown

Harrison Field
Attendance: 4000
Referee: Adam Esplin (Newark)
January 8, 1921

Fall River Rovers	4–0	Columbia Graphophone
Morgan; Adams; Parker (pk); Connie Lynch

Athletic ground, Fall River
Referee: Joe Smith

== Semifinals ==
March 19, 1921

Fall River Rovers	1–2	Fore River
71' Parker (pk)		1H' Jimmy Farquhar; 76' Shepard

Coats Field, Pawtucket, RI
Attendance: 6000
Referee: T. Cunningham (Brooklyn)
March 13, 1921

Erie	1–1	Robins Dry Dock
8' Koelsch		10' Sweeney

Harrison Field, Newark, NJ
Attendance: 6000
Referee: George Lambie (Southbridge)

replays

March 20, 1921

Erie	1–1	Robins Dry Dock
10' Dave Brown (pk)		Hosie

Harrison Field
Attendance: 7000
Referee: George Lambie (Southbridge)

April 2, 1921

Erie	4–4	Robins Dry Dock
1' Heminsley; Ford; 51' Brown (pk); OT' Sturch		25' Harry Ratican; Harry Ratican (pk); 87' McGuire; OT' Spalding (pk)

Cahill Field, Philadelphia, PA
Attendance: 5000
Referee: George Lambie (Southbridge)
April 9, 1921

Erie	1–4	Robins Dry Dock
Archie Stark		24' Sweeney; 48', 57', 67' McKelvey

Disston Ball Park, Tacony, PA
Attendance: 5000
Referee: Stark (Detroit)

== Final ==

The American Cup final took place at Harrison Field in Harrison, NJ on May 8. Fore River and Robins had met previously in the quarterfinals of the National Challenge Cup with Robins prevailing 3–0 and continuing on to win the Dewar trophy. On this occasion Robins Dry Dock would again win over Fore River 5–2 to earn a double. Robins were third in the National League while Fore River won first place honors in the Southern New England League.

May 8, 1921	Robins Dry Dock	5–2	Fore River	Harrisom, NJ
3:00PM	11', 50', Ratican; 1H', 52' Sweeney; 35' Hosie		10' Page; Black (pk)	Stadium: Harrison Field; Attendance: 5100; Referee: George Young (Philadelphia)
Note: Other source shows Corrigan scored second Fore River goal

American Cup final in Harrison Field on May 8, 1921. Captain Beardsworth of the Brooklyn team and Captain Joe Black of the Fore River eleven shake hands just before the game started.

== See also ==
- 1920–21 National Challenge Cup
- 1920–21 National Association Foot Ball League season
- 1920–21 Southern New England Soccer League season
