= Dick Spalding =

American baseball player (1893-1950)

Personal information
- Full name: Charles Harry Spalding
- Date of birth: October 13, 1893
- Place of birth: Philadelphia, United States
- Date of death: February 3, 1950 (aged 56)
- Place of death: Philadelphia, United States
- Height: 5 ft 11 in (1.80 m)
- Position: Defender

Youth career
- Northeast Manual Training School
- Lighthouse Boys Club

Senior career*
Years	Team	Apps	(Gls)
1912	Philadelphia		
1915–1916	Disston A.A.		
1916–1917	Bethlehem Steel F.C.		
1919–1921	Philadelphia Merchant Ship		
1921–1922	Harrison S.C.	12	(0)
1924–1925	Fleisher Yarn	14	(0)

International career
1916	United States	2	(1)
- * Club domestic league appearances and goals

Dick Spalding
- Outfielder
- Batted: Left Threw: Left

MLB debut
- April 18, 1927, for the Philadelphia Phillies

Last MLB appearance
- July 12, 1928, for the Washington Senators

MLB statistics
- Batting average: .299
- Home runs: 0
- Runs batted in: 25
- Stats at Baseball Reference

Teams
- Philadelphia Phillies (1927); Washington Senators (1928)

Charles Harry "Dick" Spalding (October 13, 1893 – February 3, 1950) was an American soccer and baseball player. He played the first two games in the history of the U.S. men's national soccer team and competed in professional soccer for nearly fifteen years, primarily with teams based in Pennsylvania. Besides, Spalding spent two seasons in Major League baseball and later served as a first base coach. A lifelong resident of Philadelphia, he was inducted into the National Soccer Hall of Fame in 1951.

== Soccer ==
=== Club career ===
Spalding attended the Northeast Manual Training School in Philadelphia, where he was a multi-sport athlete. He then went on to play soccer with the Lighthouse Boys Club as well as several other local Philadelphia clubs. In 1916, when called into the U.S. men's national team, he was with the Disston A.A. In the fall of 1916, he signed with Bethlehem Steel F.C. of the National Association Football League (NAFBL). However, he injured his knee and did not play consistently until January 1917. In November 1919, he signed with Philadelphia Merchant Ship of the NAFBL. In 1921, he joined the Harrison S.C. of the American Soccer League (ASL). He then spent the 1924–1925 ASL season with Fleisher Yarn.

=== National team ===
In 1916, the United States Football Association (USFA) recruited a team, called the All-American Soccer Football Team, to represent the U.S. on a tour of Scandinavian countries. At the time, these countries and the U.S. were all neutral during the ongoing World War I. During the six game tour, the U.S. played two recognized international games, one on August 21, 1916, against Sweden and another on September 3, 1916, against Norway. There are disagreements about who scored the first national team goals. While the National Soccer Hall of Fame lists Spalding, other sources state that Thomas Swords scored an unassisted goal against Sweden. After this tour, Spalding never played for the U.S. again.

He was inducted into the National Soccer Hall of Fame in 1950.

== Baseball ==
=== Player ===
In addition to his soccer career, Spalding was also a successful baseball player. In 1916, while a member of the U.S. national soccer team, he played in a baseball game against a Swedish baseball team from Västerås. In 1927, he signed as an outfielder the National League Philadelphia Phillies. In 1928, he moved to the Washington Senators of the American League. Spalding also spent time in the International League where he played for the Rochester Red Wings and the Buffalo Bisons.

=== First base coach ===
1942 picture pack card of Kiki Cuyler, Jimmie Wilson and Spalding (right)

Spalding's friendship with Jimmie Wilson led to two stints as a first base coach. In 1934, Wilson hired Spalding as the first base coach for the Philadelphia Phillies. In 1941, he was brought into the Chicago Cubs, again by Wilson, to become the Cubs’ first base coach.

Spalding died in Philadelphia at the age of 56 after a long illness.
