= Bill Duncan =

Scottish footballer (1880–?)

Personal information
- Full name: William Duncan
- Date of birth: 14 March 1880
- Place of birth: Condorrat, Scotland
- Position: Goalkeeper

Senior career*
Years	Team	Apps	(Gls)
- St Mirren
- Celtic
- Airdrieonians
1915–1921	Bethlehem Steel		
1922–1923	Fall River United	3	(0)
- * Club domestic league appearances and goals

William Duncan (born 14 March 1880) was a Scottish football goalkeeper who played professionally in Scotland and the United States.

Duncan was born in Condoratt, Scotland. He began his career with St Mirren F.C. At some point, he moved to Celtic F.C. where he won the 1909–10 league championship. He also played for Airdrieonians He then moved to the United States where in 1915, he signed with Bethlehem Steel of the National Association Football League. Duncan and his teammates won the 1915 National Challenge Cup. He would go on to win the Cup another three times with Bethlehem, in 1916, 1918 and 1919. In 1919, Duncan was part of the Bethlehem Steel tour of South America. In 1922, he joined Fall River United in the American Soccer League. He played only three games with the team before retiring, but not before playing against the Dick, Kerr Lady Soccer Team.
