= Billy Adam =

Scottish footballer

Personal information
- Full name: William Adam
- Place of birth: Paisley, Scotland
- Position: Forward

Senior career*
| Years | Team | Apps | (Gls) |
| 1921–1922 | St Mirren | 2 | (1) |
| 1922–1931 | J&P Coats | 252 | (61) |
- * Club domestic league appearances and goals

William Adam was an early twentieth-century Scottish association football forward who played nine seasons in the American Soccer League.

In 1921, Adam joined St Mirren F.C. He left the team and Scotland during the 1922–1923 season to sign with J&P Coats of the American Soccer League. Adam remained with J&P Coat until 1931, the last two seasons with team was known as Pawtucket Rangers.
