= 1914–15 Southern New England Soccer League season =

Southern New England Soccer League
- Season: 1914–15
- Champions: New Bedford F.C. 1st title
- Matches: 38
- Goals: 142 (3.74 per match)

Statistics of Southern New England Soccer League in season 1914-15.

== League standings ==
                          GP   W   L   T  GF  GA   PTS
New Bedford F.C.          16  10   1   5  42   9   25
YMCTAS                    14   9   3   2  33  16   20
J&P Coats                 14   7   2   5  29  16   19
Pawtucket                 16   2  11   3  26  53    7
Taunton City              16   2  13   1  12  48    5
