= Frank Booth (Australian footballer) =

Australian rules footballer

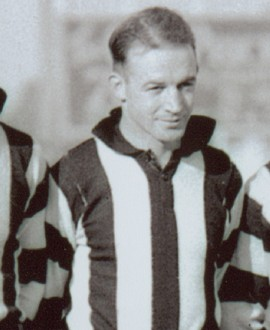
- Booth in 1938

Personal information
- Full name: Frank Vincent Booth
- Born: 28 February 1916; Northcote, Victoria
- Died: 28 July 1974 (aged 58); New South Wales
- Original team: Balwyn United Churches
- Height: 179 cm (5 ft 10 in)
- Weight: 83 kg (183 lb)

Playing career^{1}
Years	Club	Games (Goals)
1938	Collingwood	6 (2)
1939	Hawthorn	3 (2)
Total		9 (4)
- ^{1} Playing statistics correct to the end of 1939.

Frank Vincent Booth (28 February 1916 – 28 July 1974) was an Australian rules footballer who played with Collingwood and Hawthorn in the Victorian Football League (VFL).
