= 1917–18 Southern New England Soccer League season =

Southern New England Soccer League
- Season: 1917–18
- Champions: J&P Coats; 1st title

Statistics of Southern New England Soccer League in season 1917–18.

== League standings ==
Participating teams:

- Fall River Rovers
- Pan-American FC
- New Bedford Whalers
- New Bedford Celtics
- Fore River Shipbuilding Company Stars
- J&P Coats
- Crompton FC
- Greystone FC
- Lonsdale FC

The season was called off late in the spring; many games had been cancelled due to poor weather, and many teams were away for extended periods due to their progress in the American Cup and National Challenge Cup competitions. J&P Coats won the league title.
