= Continentals F.C. =

- Full name: Continentals Football Club
- Founded: 1914
- Dissolved: 1918
- League: New York State Amateur Football League

The Continentals Football Club of New York City was a U.S. soccer team which had a brief period of national prominence from 1914 to 1918.

== History ==
The Continentals were formed as an ethnic soccer club composed of immigrants from Continental Europe. A newspaper clip from January 1914 provides a clue to the origins on the team when it mentions that in a game of the New York Footballers Protective Association, "The Continentals had previously distinguished themselves by defeating England by 6 goals to 1. On their team yesterday were players from Germany, Holland, Belgium, Switzerland and Hungary.” This competition was held annually, with the Continentals participating, until at least 1922. In April 1915, the team was finishing the 1914-1915 season in the New York State Amateur Football League (NYSAFL). They had won promotion from the second division and would finish in second place in the first division standings. That year, the team also went to the quarterfinals of the National Challenge Cup. In 1916, Harry Cooper was selected to play for the first United States men's national soccer team on its tour of Scandinavia. In 1918, the team went to the semifinals of the National Challenge Cup.

== Year-by-year ==
Year	League	Reg. season	National Challenge Cup
1914/15	NYSAFL	2nd	Quarterfinal
1915/16	NYSAFL	?	Semifinal
1916/17	NYSAFL	8th	First round
1917/18	NYSAFL	6th	Semifinal

== Honors ==
League Championship

- Runner Up (1): 1915
