= 1915–16 American Cup =

Soccer tournament

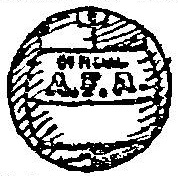

Tournament details
- Country: United States
- Dates: October 1915 – June 1916
- Teams: 37

Final positions
- Champions: Bethlehem (2nd title)
- Runners-up: Scottish American

The 1916 American Cup was the annual challenge cup held by the American Football Association. The 1916 edition included 37 teams. The title was won by Bethlehem with a 3–0 win over the Scottish Americans courtesy of a hat trick by Neil Clarke making Bethlehem the first team to win the American and National cups in the same season.

== Preliminary round ==
The draw for the preliminary and first rounds was held October 2, 1915 at the Continental Hotel in Newark, NJ. The Preliminary round was to be played by October 17 and the First round by October 31. The Celtic club of New Bedford withdrew.

New England District

October 17, 1915

Springfield FC	w/o	Celtic

Springfield, MA
October 31, 1915

General Electric (MA)	3–2	Smithfield Avenue
Gillispie; Taylor; Law		Smith; Harrison

Little River, Lynn, MA
Attendance: 500
Referee: Scott

New Jersey District

October 17, 1915

Bunker Hill PC	0–0	West Hudson Juniors

Olympic Park, Paterson, NJ
Referee: C. Ward

replay

October 24, 1915

West Hudson Juniors	2–0	Bunker Hill PC
5' Allen; 30' McCallum

Clark Field, East Newark
Referee: C. Ward

New York District

October 17, 1915

Degnon Boys	0–0	IRT Strollers

Degnon Field, Long Island City
Referee: A. Burnside

replay

November 7, 1915

IRT Strollers	2–1	Degnon Boys

Lenox Oval, Manhattan

Philadelphia District

October 16, 1915

Wanderers	4–1	Rangers
Weldon (3); Graham (1)		Lunn

Philadelphia, PA
Referee: Benjamin Groves

== First round ==
The Chicopee Rovers forfeited to Fore River of Quincy, MA while New York Hibernian forfeited to General Electric of Schenectady, NY. The Greenville Sporting and Soccer club had to replay the Olympic club of Paterson after the game was protested. The IRT Strollers protested the replay against Brooklyn for an ineligible player and proceeded to play a third game. Yonkers protested their replay because Clan MacDonald did not have an enclosed field so no gate was taken and a third game was ordered.

New England District

October 23, 1915

Chicopee Rovers	2–2	Fore River Rovers
Logan; Lowe		8' Harrison; Wood

Imperial Park, Chicopee, MA
Referee: Sam Irvine (Holyoke)
October 30, 1915

Farr Alpaca	1–1	Bridgeport City
48' Hall		88' Austin

Berkshire St. grounds, Holyoke, MA
Attendance: 600
Referee: Sam Irwin (Holyoke)
October 31, 1914

Pan–American	2–0	Springfield FC
50', 87' Tom Adams

Athletic grounds, Fall River, MA
Attendance: 200
Referee: Smith (Fall River)
January 8, 1916

Fall River Rovers	2–0	General Electric (MA)
31' Jack Dalton; 43' Tommy Swords

Athletic grounds, Fall River, MA
Attendance: 700
Referee: Thomas Lambie (Boston)

replays

October 30, 1915

Fore River Rovers	w/o	Chicopee Rovers

Quincy, MA
November 7 , 1915

Bridgeport City	2–0	Farr Alpaca
Satterwaith; Happinstall

Aerodrome, Bridgeport, CT
Attendance: 600
Referee: J. Miller (New Haven)

New Jersey District

October 31, 1915

Alley Boys	1–3	Scottish Americans
3' Del Brierly		Hemsley (2); Gradwell

Clark Athletic Field, East Newark
Referee: Charles Creighton
October 31, 1915

West Hudson	1–1	Jersey A.C.
10' Ward		87' Harry Neil

Federal League Park, Harrison
Referee: Alan Montgomery
October 31, 1915

Haledon Thistles	1–3	Kearny Athletics
17' White		7' Meduskey; Meduskey; 55' J. Sherlock

Olympic Park, Paterson, NJ
Referee: C. Ward
October 31, 1915

Babcock & Wilcox	2–1	Greenville Rovers
35' Bert Holden; 2H' Ted Finn		15' Jack Parkinson

Bayonne, NJ
Referee: Andrew Laurie

replay

November 7, 1915

Jersey A.C.	1–0	West Hudson
40' James Ford

Jersey City Baseball Park
Referee: Allan Montgomery

New York District

October 31, 1915

Yonkers	1–1	Clan MacDonald
55' Carver		12' Elliot

Tibbets Field, Yonkers, NY
Referee: A. Burnside
October 31, 1915

Columbia Oval	0–3	Brooklyn Celtic
		10' O'Hare; 30', 55' Ellis

Lenox Oval, Manhattan
Referee: W. Hollywood
October 31, 1915

Continentals	3–0	West Hudson Junior
H.Hayes; Lonie (2)

Harlem Oval, Manhattan
Referee: Vaughn E. Williams
November 8, 1914

General Electric (NY)	w/o	Hibernian

Bayonne, NY
Referee: M. Charles Ward
November 21, 1915

Brooklyn	2–2	IRT Strollers
15' Dickson; 75' Vandeweghe		17' Young; 35' Reilly

Lenox Oval, Manhattan
Referee: Allan Montgomery

replays

November 7, 1915

Clan MacDonald	1–0	Yonkers
70' Elliot

Taft's Oval, Brooklyn, NY
Referee: A. Burnside
November 28, 1915

IRT Strollers	0–3	Brooklyn
		Spicer (2); Shanholt

West Side Park, Jersey City
Referee: A. Montgomery
January 9, 1916

IRT Strollers	0–1	Brooklyn
		10'Hunziker

Harlem Field, New York
Referee: A. Montgomery
January 16, 1916

Clan MacDonald	3–1	Yonkers
15' Madden; 35' N. Agar; 70' Harrower		Ernie Garside (pk)

Olympic Park, Paterson, NJ
Referee: Ward

Pennsylvania District

October 30, 1915

Henry Disston	4–1	Wanderers
Burrows; Ware; Rodgers; Kirkpatrick		Wislon

Tacony Ball Park
Referee: James Kerr
October 30, 1915

Bethlehem	6–0	Hibernian
23' McDonald; 65' Fleming (pk); Dean; Pepper; Fleming		35' Irwin Jones (og)

East End Field, Bethlehem, PA
Referee: George Allen
October 30, 1915

Feltonville	3–3	Falls CFC
2' H.Derbyshire; 70' Phillips; 86' Shaw		22' Foster (pk); 32' Foster (pk); Clegg

Stenton Field, Philadelphia, PA
Referee: James Steele

replay

November 6, 1915

Falls CFC	5–2	Feltonville
25' Clegg; 65' Mellors; Clegg; 68' Kendall; Mellors		27' Tom Derbyshire; 2H' Tom Derbyshire

Northeast Manual HS Grounds, Philadelphia
Referee: James Steel

== Second round ==
The draw for the second round was held November 6, 1915 at the Continental hotel in Newark, NJ. Matches were due to be played on or before November 28. The Falls Cricket and Football Club forfeited to Pan–American of Fall River, MA.

November 27, 1915

Fore River Rovers	2–2	Babcock & Wilcox
Daley; 80' Harrison		30' Millar; Finn

Quincy Point
Attendance: 500
Referee: Catto (Quincy)
November 28, 1915

Continental	1–3	Brooklyn Celtic
15' Van den Eynden		10' Ellis; 30' Crone; 65' Ellis

Harlem Oval
Attendance: 1500
Referee: David M. Whyte
November 28, 1915

Falls CFC	w/o	Pan–American

November 28, 1915

Kearny Athletics	0–4	Scottish American
		50' Tommy Gradwell; 75' Johnny Hemsley; Tom Stark; 88' Alec Bell

Clark's Field, East Newark
Attendance: 1000
Referee: C. Ward
December 25, 1915

Jersey A.C.	1–1	General Electric (NY)
Kempe		88' Lewis

West Side Park, Jersey City
Referee: Charlie Ward (Passaic)
January 23, 1916

Bridgeport City	3–1	Brooklyn
Griffin; Waite; Heppinstall		30' Crompton

Newfield Park
Referee: J. Miller (New Haven)
January 29, 1916

Bethlehem Steel	2–0	Clan MacDonald
Pepper; Brown

East End Field, Bethlehem, PA
Attendance: 6000
Referee: Allen Montgomery (Newark)
April 24, 1916

Henry Disston	0–1	Fall River Rovers
		16' Tommy Swords

Tacony Ball Park, Philadelphia, PA
Referee: George Young

replays

December 26, 1915

Babcock & Wilcox	3–0	Fore River Rovers
1H' Harding; 55' Aitken; 75' Millar

B&W park, Bayonne, NJ
Attendance: 400
Referee: David M. White (Brooklyn)
January 9, 1916

Jersey A.C.	1–0	General Electric (NY)
25' Jack Neilson

West Side Park, Jersey City
Referee: Charles Ward (Passaic)

== Third round ==
The draw for the third round was held December 4, 1915 at the Continental hotel in Newark, NJ.

January 9, 1916

Scottish American	2–1	Brooklyn Celtic
20' Rabbit Hemsley; 21' Archie Stark		83' Charlie Ellis

Clark's Field, East Newark
Attendance: 1500
Referee: William Hollywood (New York)
April 2, 1916

Bridgeport City	2–1	Babcock & Wilcox
Satterwaite		17', 20' Robert Millar

Newfield Park, Bridgeport, CT
Attendance: 3000
Referee: J. Miller (New Haven)
April 30, 1916

Jersey A.C.	0–5	Bethlehem Steel
		23', 46' Pepper; Neil Clark; Fleming; MacDonald

Federal League Park, Harrison
Attendance: 3000
Referee: C.E. Creighton (New York)
May 13, 1916

Pan–American	0–2	Fall River Rovers
		37' Tommy Swords; 82' Jack Dalton

Athletic Park, Fall River, MA
Attendance: 3000
Referee: George Mitchell (New Bedford)

== Semifinals ==
May 20, 1916

Fall River Rovers	1–3	Bethlehem Steel
36' Swords		30' Brown; 37' McKelvie; 80' Brown

Athletic Park, Fall River, MA
Attendance: 6000
Referee: Lambie (Boston)
May 21, 1916

Babcock & Wilcox	1–3	Scottish American
60' Aitken		10', 17' Gradwell; Hemsley

B&W Park, Bayonne, NJ
Attendance: 5000
Referee: Andrew Laurie (Newark)

== Final ==

The American Cup final took place in Taylor Stadium at Lehigh University in Bethlehem, Pennsylvania. The Scottish Americans, runners–up in the National Association Football League, were the defending champions of the American Cup and it was their fourth final appearance overall. Bethlehem Steel came into the final having played 32 games winning 28 with three ties and a single loss. They had scored 116 goals with 14 against. On May 6 they won the National Challenge Cup over Fall River. Their American Cup win was then followed up by an American League of Philadelphia title when they were declared joint champions along with Disston on June 15. Neil Clarke scored a hat trick for the Steelmen with a goal in the 15th minute followed by two more in the second half.

June 10, 1916

Bethlehem Steel	3–0	Scottish American
Neil Clarke (3)

Taylor Field, Bethlehem, PA
Attendance: 5000
Referee: David M.Whyte

== Champions ==

Bethlehem Steel Football Club, National and American Cup champions 1915–16.

== See also ==
- 1916 National Challenge Cup
- 1915–16 National Association Foot Ball League season
- 1915–16 Southern New England Soccer League season
