= Bob Drummond (footballer, born 1898) =

Scottish footballer

Personal information
- Full name: Robert Cray Drummond
- Date of birth: 1898
- Place of birth: Dalmeny, Scotland
- Date of death: after 1927 (at least aged 29)
- Height: 5 ft 7 in (1.70 m)
- Position: Inside forward

Senior career*
Years	Team	Apps	(Gls)
1924–1925	Burnley	3	(0)
1925–1926	Pembroke Dock		
1926–1927	Bristol City	2	(1)
1927–1928	Bournemouth & Boscombe	7	(1)
- * Club domestic league appearances and goals

Robert Cray Drummond (1898 – after 1927) was a Scottish professional association footballer who played as an inside forward.
