= 1919–20 Southern New England Soccer League season =

Southern New England Soccer League
- Season: 1919–20

Statistics of Southern New England Soccer League in season 1919-20.

== League standings ==
                          GP   W   L   T   PTS
J&P Coats
General Electrics [Lynn]
Fall River Rovers
