= 1916–17 Southern New England Soccer League season =

Southern New England Soccer League
- Season: 1916–17
- Champions: New Bedford F.C. 2nd title
- Matches: 32
- Goals: 110 (3.44 per match)

Statistics of Southern New England Soccer League in season 1916-17.

== League standings ==
                        GP   W   L   T   GF  GA  PTS
New Bedford F.C.         8   6   1   1   18  10  13
Fall River Rovers        8   4   2   2   15  12  10
J&P Coats               11   4   5   2   20  18  10
Howard & Bullough FC     7   4   3   0   12  10   8
New Bedford Celtics      8   3   3   2   15  14   8
Crompton                11   2   6   3   13  20   7
Pan Americans            6   3   3   0    9  10   6
Fore River               5   1   4   0    8  16   0
