= 1920–21 Southern New England Soccer League season =

Southern New England Soccer League
- Season: 1920–21
- Champions: Fore River; 1st title

Statistics of Southern New England Soccer League in season 1920-21.

== League standings ==
                          GP   W   L   T   PTS
Fore River                16  11   2   3   25
Fall River Rovers         15   7   3   5   19
J&P Coats                 13   7   3   3   17
Sayles Finishing Plant    14   4   9   1    9
St.Michael's               7   1   4   2    4
 disbanded; record taken over by:
Sharp Mfg. Co.            10   2   5   3    7
Crompton                  10   0   9   1    1
