= 1915–16 Southern New England Soccer League season =

Southern New England Soccer League
- Season: 1915–16

Statistics of Southern New England Soccer League in season 1915–16.

== League standings ==
                          GP   W   L   T   PTS
Fall River Pan Americans 
J&P Coats 
New Bedford Celtics
New Bedford Whalers
Howard & Bullough F.C.
Fall River Rovers
Fore River
