= 1917–18 National Challenge Cup =

American soccer tournament season

- Dewar Challenge Cup

Tournament details
- Country: United States
- Dates: December 25, 1917– May 19, 1918

Final positions
- Champions: Bethlehem Steel (3rd title)
- Runners-up: Fall River Rovers
- Semifinalists: West Hudson A.C.F.; Joliet F.C.

The United States had recently entered World War I, and the soccer world felt the effects as increasing numbers of players joined the armed forces to wage battle in Europe. Soccer was not as hard-hit as some other sports, but all leagues felt the impact; in fact the Čechie team of Chicago lost every member of its roster to enlistment. The United States Soccer Football Association issued a call to its member associations for teams to resist the temptation to strengthen their teams at the expense of others — when wealthy, but decimated teams eye the poorer but complete teams, their wallets and checkbooks should remain pocketed in the name of fair play. A welcome consequence of the war situation was a willingness of the USFA's own warring factions to end their dispute and work together in relative harmony during those trying times. Many soccer organizations launched fund raising campaigns and benefit matches to raise money to provide support for U.S. soldiers through, among other means, the provision of soccer equipment and gear to enhance their recreational opportunities. One such project was the Soccer Football Chain Letter Fund launched by Thomas Cahill and the USFA.

Other welcome events included record attendance figures in some late-round games of the National Challenge Cup that were well promoted. One of the major topics of discussion was the pros and cons of substitutes. At the time the laws did not specifically allow nor outlaw substitutes per se, but the consensus was that eventually they would become a reality. For the 1917-18 year, the USFA reported receipts of $6,318.64 and disbursements of $3,034.39, giving the USFA a net worth of $2,784.25 in cash and one $500.00 Liberty Bond.

== Bracket ==
Home teams listed on top of bracket

Third Round; Dec 25-Mar 23
PA	McKeesport F.C.	9
NY	Rochester Celtics	0
PA	Bethlehem Steel F.C.	2
PA	Disston A.A.	1
IL	Joliet F.C.	2-9
IL	Scottish Americans	2-2
OH	Cleveland F.C.	3
MI	Corinthians	1
MA	Lynn Hibernians	6
MA	Fore River	1
MA	Fall River Rovers	3
MA	Pan-Americans	1
NJ	West Hudson A.C.F.	4
NY	New York F.C.	3
NY	New York IRT	3
NJ	Paterson F.C.	4

Quarterfinals; March 2–24
PA	McKeesport F.C.	0
PA	Bethlehem Steel F.C.	5
IL	Joliet F.C.	4
OH	Cleveland F.C.	2
MA	Lynn Hibernians	0
MA	Fall River Rovers	5
NJ	West Hudson A.C.F	4-5
NJ	Paterson F.C.	4-1

Semifinals; Mar 30, Apr 20
PA	Bethlehem Steel F.C.	4
IL	Joliet F.C.	0
MA	Fall River Rovers	3
NY	West Hudson A.C.F	1

Finals; May 5,19
PA	Bethlehem Steel F.C.	2-3
MA	Fall River Rovers	2-0

(*) replay after tied match

== Final ==
=== First game ===
May 4, 1918

Fall River Rovers (MA)	2–2 (a.e.t.)	Bethlehem Steel (PA)
Sullivan 10'; Chadwick 45'	Report	Ratican 4' (Fleming); Fleming (Murphy)

Heritage Park, Fall River, Massachusetts
Attendance: 13,000
Referee: Charles Creighton, New York (USA)

=== Replay ===
May 19, 1918

Bethlehem Steel (PA)	3–0	Fall River Rovers (MA)
Ratican 30' (Ferguson), 75' (Fleming); Pepper 32'	Report

Federal League Park, Harrison, New Jersey
Attendance: 10,000
Referee: Charles Creighton, New York (USA)

== See also ==
- 1918 American Cup
