= 1917–18 American Cup =

Soccer tournament

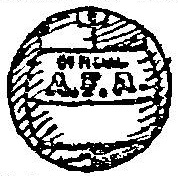

Tournament details
- Country: United States
- Dates: October 1917 – May 1918
- Teams: 29

Final positions
- Champions: Bethlehem (4th title)
- Runners-up: Babcock & Wilcox

The 1918 American Cup was the annual challenge cup held by the American Football Association. At the A.F.A.'s annual meeting on June 2 at the Continental Hotel in Newark, NJ the delegates elected were president Duncan Carswell of Orange, vice–president Donald McMillan of East Newark, recording secretary Robert M. Marshall of Kearny, and financial secretary/treasurer Andrew H. Beveridge of Arlington.In a reversal from the previous season, State associations could not restrict teams from entering multiple competitions. Twenty-nine teams entered the competition. Bethlehem Steel won the trophy for the third straight time and fourth overall.

== First round ==
The draw for the first round was held October 13, 1917 at the Continental Hotel in Newark, NJ. The first-round games were scheduled to be completed by October 28. J. & P. Coats of Pawtucket, Jersey A.C., and the Wanderers of Philadelphia drew byes. The New York/Clan MacDonald replay was protested and a third game was ordered.

New York, New Jersey, Connecticut District

October 27, 1917

IRT Strollers	4–3	Passaic
Bark (2); Edmondson; Dahill		Kydd; Brogan; McNair

Lenox Oval, NY
Referee: A. Birchall
October 28, 1917

West Hudson	8–1	Alley Boys
Tintle (4); Stark; Knowles; Dugan (2)		McCartin

Clark's Field, East Newark
Referee: J. Russell
October 28, 1917

Scottish American	4–2	Kinley
35' Ellis; 44' Ford (pk); 2H' Ford; Forfar		15' Clouse; John Kinsella

Clark's Field, East Newark
Referee: C. Ward
October 28, 1917

Babcock & Wilcox	7–0	West NY Blues
10' Miller; 15' Peter Sweeney; 1H' Clark; 2H' Peter Sweeney (4)

Bayonne, NJ
Attendance: 300
Referee: John Cunningham
October 28, 1917

Paterson	9–1	Bunker Hill
Van De Weghe (4); Hayes (3); Gradwell; Lindquist		Hughes

Olympic Park, Paterson, NJ
Referee: Andrew Laurie
October 28, 1917

New York	0–0	Clan MacDonald

Lenox Oval, NY
Referee: A. Birchall
October 28, 1917

Bridgeport City	2–2	Clan MacDuff
5' Fildes; Satterwaite (pk)		McLoughlin; 75' McKenna

Meadows, Bridgeport, CT
Referee: G. Denholme (Ansonia)

replays

November 11, 1917

New York	3–0	Clan MacDonald
65' Petrie; 70' Hunziker; Adamson

Lenox Oval, NY
Referee: A. Birchall
November 18, 1917

Clan MacDuff	2–0	Bridgeport City
Sanderson (2)

Lenox Oval, NY
Referee: T. Cunningham
November 25, 1917

New York	2–0	Clan MacDonald
Petrie (2)

Lenox Oval, NY
Referee: Laurie

Northern Massachusetts District

October 27, 1917

Fisk Red Top	1–1	Fore River
30' Bill Smith		Bradford

Fisk Park, Chicopee Falls
Referee: R. Young (Holyoke)

replay

November 24, 1917

Fore River	1–0	Fisk Red Top
Straddan

Quincy, MA
Referee: Lambie (Boston)

Massachusetts/Rhode Island District

October 27, 1917

Pan American	5–0	New Bedford
5', 42' Holland; 59' Newman; 65' West		Barker (og)

Athletic Grounds, Fall River
Attendance: 800
Referee: George Mitchell (New Bedford)
October 27, 1917

New Bedford Celtic	1–1	Fall River Rovers
75' Bennie Wilson		72' Billy Stone (pk)

Page Mill, New Bedford
Attendance: 1200
Referee: William Taylor (Boston)
October 28, 1917

Crompton	4–0	Greystone
15' John Cullerton; 70' Poole; St. John; Carroll

Crompton, RI
Referee: Ed Pemberton

replay

November 17, 1917

Fall River Rovers	6–1	New Bedford Celtic
12' Smith; Pete Bouchard; Fred Beardsworth; Tommy Swords; Morgan (2)		Wilson

Athletic Grounds, Fall River
Attendance: 1800
Referee: Taylor (Pawtucket)

Pennsylvania District

October 27, 1917

Bethlehem Steel	7–0	Veterans
23', 25', 40' Forrest; 15', 1H' Easton; 2H' Fleming; 2H' Pepper

New Athletic Field, Bethlehem
Referee: George Allen (Philadelphia)
October 27, 1917

Fall	1–7	Disston
H. Beech		1H' R. Hyslop; 9' Scott Wilson; 40', 2H' Barrett; Andrews; 2H' R. Hyslop; Kevis

Tacony Ball Park
Referee: Jimmy Steel

== Second round ==
The draw for the second round was held November 3, 1917 at the Continental hotel in Newark, NJ. Matches were due to be played on or before November 29. The Wanderers of Philadelphia withdrew because they could not afford the trip to Quincy, MA. The Pan–Americans of Fall River withdrew from the tournament when they could not agree on financial arrangements with Bethlehem Steel management.

November 24, 1917

Bethlehem Steel	w/o	Pan–American

Bethlehem, PA
November 24, 1917

Fall River Rovers	3–1	Jersey A.C.
2' Turner; 5', 2H' Swords		75' Fisher (pk)

Athletic grounds, Fall River
Attendance: 1500
Referee: Norse (New Bedford)
November 24, 1917

J&P Coats	1–4	Henry Disston
20' Allcock		10' Barrett; 1H' Andrews; 67' Burnett; 2H' Andrews

Lonsdale Ave grounds
Referee: Mitchell (New Bedford)
November 25, 1917

Babcock & Wilcox	3–2	Scottish American
15' Bill Elliott; Sweeney; 49' Dave Muir		2H', 83' Del Brierley

B. & W. Grounds, Bayonne, NJ
Attendance: 300
Referee: Thomas Cunningham (Brooklyn)
November 25, 1917

West Hudson	2–1	Paterson
20' Duggan; 55' Knowles		87' Vandeweghe

Clark's Field, East Newark
Referee: G. Caldicott
March 17, 1918

Crompton	1–4	Bridgeport City
2H' not mentioned		Percy Hardy (3); Joseph Satterwaite

Hawthorne Field, Brooklyn
Referee: Edward Pemberton (Pawtucket)
March 17, 1918

IRT Strollers	3–2	New York FC
20' Dahill; 55' Quinn; MacDonald (pk)		15', 65' Hunziker

Olympic Park, Harlem
Referee: W. Lawrie
April 6, 1918

Fore River	w/o	Wanderers

Quincy, MA

== Third round ==
March 2, 1918

Henry Disston	2–0	West Hudson
70', 2H' Andrews

Disstons' Ball Park
Referee: James Steele (Philadelphia)
March 23, 1918

Bethlehem Steel	5–1	IRT Strollers
Ratican; Fleming; Murphy; Fleming (pk)		Kidd (og); 89' Young

Athletic Field, Bethlehem, PA
Referee: James Kerr (Philadelphia)
March 24, 1918

Bridgeport City	1–1	Babcock & Wilcox
60' Joseph Satterwaite		88' Herbert Holden

Meadows, Bridgeport, CT
Attendance: 900
Referee: George Denholm (Ansonia)
April 27, 1918

Fore River	3–0	Fall River
13' Straden; 53' Brown; 78' Davy Page

Quincy, MA
Attendance: 500
Referee: George Lambie

replay

March 31, 1918

Babcock & Wilcox	2–1	Bridgeport City
20' Muir; OT' Aitken		70' Hardy

Lexington Ave grounds, Bayonne
Attendance: 800
Referee: George Denholm (Ansonia)

== Semifinals ==
April 20, 1918

Bethlehem Steel	2–2	Henry Disston
2H' Pepper; 2OT' Ratican		15' Barrett; 2OT' Eastwood

Athletic Field, Bethlehem, PA
Referee: George Young (Philadelphia)
May 11, 1918

Fore River	0–2	Babcock & Wilcox
		Smith; Millar

Quincy, MA
Referee: George Lambie

replay

April 27, 1918

Henry Disston	0–1	Bethlehem Steel
		89' Ratican

Tacony Ball Park
Referee: George Young (Philadelphia)

== Final ==

The American Cup final took place in J. & P. Coats Park in Pawtucket, RI. Bethlehem Steel won their fourth American Cup and third in succession. This win was coupled with a National Challenge Cup title after defeating Fall River on May 20. They came close to a third title but fell short finishing second in the National Association Football League to Paterson.

May 25, 1918

Babcock & Wilcox	0–1	Bethlehem Steel
		85' Jimmy Campbell

Coats Field, Pawtucket, RI
Attendance: 3000
Referee: George Lambie

== See also ==
- 1918 National Challenge Cup
- 1917–18 National Association Foot Ball League season
- 1917–18 Southern New England Soccer League season
