= Southern New England Soccer League =

Semi-professional soccer league

The Southern New England Soccer League was a semi-professional soccer league based in New England which was established in 1914 and collapsed in 1921. During its short existence, it featured some of the top teams in the northeast United States. Dissatisfaction with league mismanagement led to the end of the SNESL in 1921 as several teams moved to the newly created American Soccer League.

== History ==
The Southern New England Soccer League's first season, 1914–15, went well with the New Bedford Whalers taking the league title based on a single table points system. However, the 1915–16 season introduced many of the problems that would plague the league until its demise. Several teams refused to travel to away games and weather caused the cancellation of others. Those circumstances resulted in the cancellation of the season at a now unknown point at which Fore River was topping the standings. While the 1916–17 season went better than the previous one, it still left a lot to be desired. Two teams played eleven games (J&P Coats and Crompton) and the rest varied from five to eight games completed. The 1917–18 season was again cancelled for many of the same reasons as the 1915–16 season, but this time the league awarded the championship to J&P Coats. The next year, 1918–19, the season was cancelled entirely due to the loss of players to military service in World War I. While the league resumed play in 1919–20, records have not allowed a complete reconstruction of the season. In the 1920–21 season, the league held what was its most successful season. Only one team played less than ten games, and it disbanded during the season. Most of the teams played at least thirteen with a high of sixteen by the champions Fore River. However, frustration at the constant mismanagement led several of the teams to join with teams from the professional National Association Football League to create the American Soccer League. The ASL began its first season in the fall of 1921 at which point the NAFBL and SNESL both disbanded.

== Seasons ==
Season	Winner
1914–15	New Bedford Whalers
1915–16	No champion
1916–17	New Bedford Whalers
1917–18	J&P Coats
1918–19	Cancelled
1919–20	Unknown
1920–21	Fore River

== Teams ==
- New Bedford Whalers (1914–1921)
- YMCTAS (New Bedford Temps) (1914–1915)
- J&P Coats (1914–1921)
- Pawtucket (1914–1915)
- Taunton City (1914–1915)
- Fall River Pan Americans (1915–1918)
- New Bedford Celtics (1915–1918)
- Howard & Bullough (1915–1917)
- Fall River Rovers (1915–)
- Fore River (Fore River Shipbuilding Company Stars) (1915–1921)
- Crompton F.C. (1916–1921)
- Greystone F.C. (1917–1918)
- Lonsdale F.C. (1917–1918)
- General Electrics (1919–1920)
- Sayles Finishing Plant F.C. (1920–1921)
- St. Michael’s (1920, disbanded after seven games)
- Sharp Manufacturing Company (1920–1921)
