= 1916–17 National Challenge Cup =

American soccer tournament season

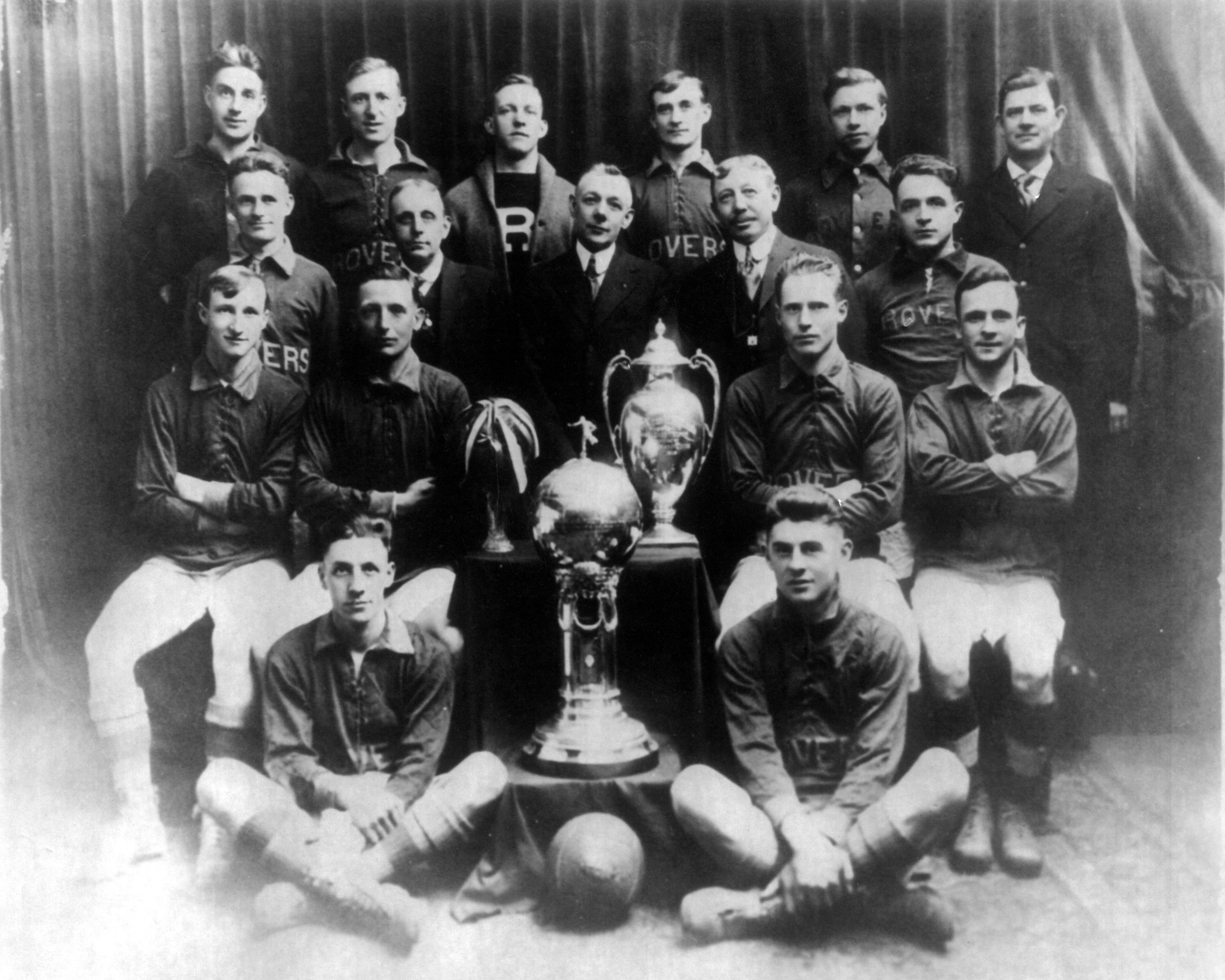
- Fall River Rovers, champions

Tournament details
- Country: United States

Final positions
- Champions: Fall River Rovers (1st title)
- Runners-up: Bethlehem Steel

The 1916–17 National Challenge Cup was the fourth annual cup tournament held by the United States Football Association. On May 5, 1917, Fall River Rovers defeated Bethlehem Steel to take the title. Thomas Swords scored the game-winning goal thirty seconds into the game. The second round match on January 28 between Bay Ridge of Brooklyn and the Newark Scottish-Americans was originally awarded to Bay Ridge for non-appearance of the Scots. Despite Bay Ridge having played and won their third-round game 2–0 over New York, the Bay Ridge/Scots game was ordered replayed by the cup committee. The Scots won the replay and went on to face New York in the third round.

== Bracket ==
Home teams listed on top of bracket

The trophy awarded

Second Round; December 16, 1916 – March 4, 1917
MA	Fall River Rovers	3
MA	New Bedford F.C.	1
MA	Lynn Hibernians	1
MA	Lawrence Olympics	0
MA	Andover United	w/o
MA	Clan McLennan
RI	Howard & Bullough F.C.	0-5
RI	Crompton F.C.	0-2
PA	Disston A.A.	13
NJ	Jersey A.C.	0
CT	Bridgeport F.C.	4
CT	British American	0
PA	Putnam F.C.	0
NY	New York F.C.	2
NJ	Scottish Americans	2
NY	Bay Ridge	1
NJ	West Hudson A.A.	2
NY	Clan MacDonald	1
PA	Bethlehem Steel	3
NY	Brooklyn Celtic	1
PA	Homestead F.C.	9
PA	Juniata PR	2
OH	White Automobile	1
OH	Cleveland Thistles	0
MI	Caledonia F.C.	3
MI	St. George F.C.	1
NY	Rochester City	0
MI	Detroit F.C.	1
IL	Pullman F.C.	1
IL	McDuffs	3
IL	Joliet F.C.	2
IL	Bricklayers and Masons	1

Third Round; February 3, 1917 – March 31, 1917
MA	Fall River Rovers	3
MA	Lynn Hibernians	1
MA	Andover United	2
RI	Howard & Bullough F.C.	5
PA	Disston A.A.	1
CT	Bridgeport	0
NY	New York F.C.	6
NY	Scottish Americans	4
NJ	West Hudson A.A.	0
PA	Bethlehem Steel	3
PA	Homestead F.C.	2
OH	White Automobile	1
MI	Caledonia F.C.	2
MI	Detroit F.C.	1
IL	McDuffs	1
IL	Joliet F.C.	6

Quarterfinals; March 3, 1917 – April 8, 1917
MA	Fall River Rovers	6
RI	Howard & Bullough F.C.	1
PA	Disston A.A.	2
NY	New York F.C.	0
PA	Bethlehem Steel	2
PA	Homestead F.C.	1
MI	Caledonia F.C.	0
IL	Joliet F.C.	4

Semifinals; April 21, 1917
MA	Fall River Rovers	1-4
PA	Disston A.A.	1-3
PA	Bethlehem Steel	6
IL	Joliet F.C.	0

Final; May 5, 1917
MA	Fall River Rovers	1
PA	Bethlehem Steel	0

(*) replay after tied match w/o walkover/forfeit victory awarded

== Final ==
May 5, 1917

Fall River Rovers (MA)	1–0	Bethlehem Steel (PA)
Swords 1'	Report

Coates Field, Pawtucket, Rhode Island
Attendance: 7,000
Referee: W. Taylor (USA)

== See also ==
- 1917 American Cup

== Sources ==
- USOpenCup.com
