= American Cup =

U.S. soccer competition

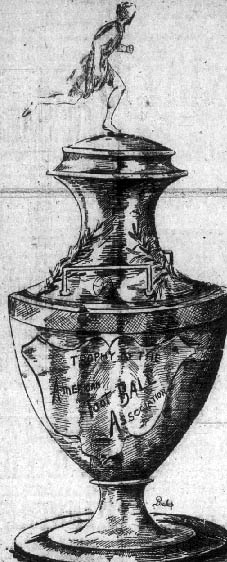
- The trophy as depicted in an illustration published in 1891
- Organizer(s): AFA
- Founded: 1884; 142 years ago
- Abolished: 1924; 102 years ago
- Region: United States
- Teams: Open
- Related competitions: National Challenge Cup
- Last champion: Bethlehem Steel (1924)
- Most championships: Bethlehem Steel (6 titles)

The American Football Association Challenge Cup (also known as the American Association Cup or simply American Cup) was the first major U.S. soccer competition open to teams beyond a single league. It was first held in 1884, and organised by the American Football Association (AFA).

In the 1910s, it gradually declined in importance with the establishment of the National Challenge Cup. The competition was last held in 1924.

== History ==
Founded in 1884, the American Football Association (AFA) was the first non-league organizing body in the United States. Allied with the Football Association, the AFA sought to standardize rules for teams competing in northern New Jersey and southern New York.

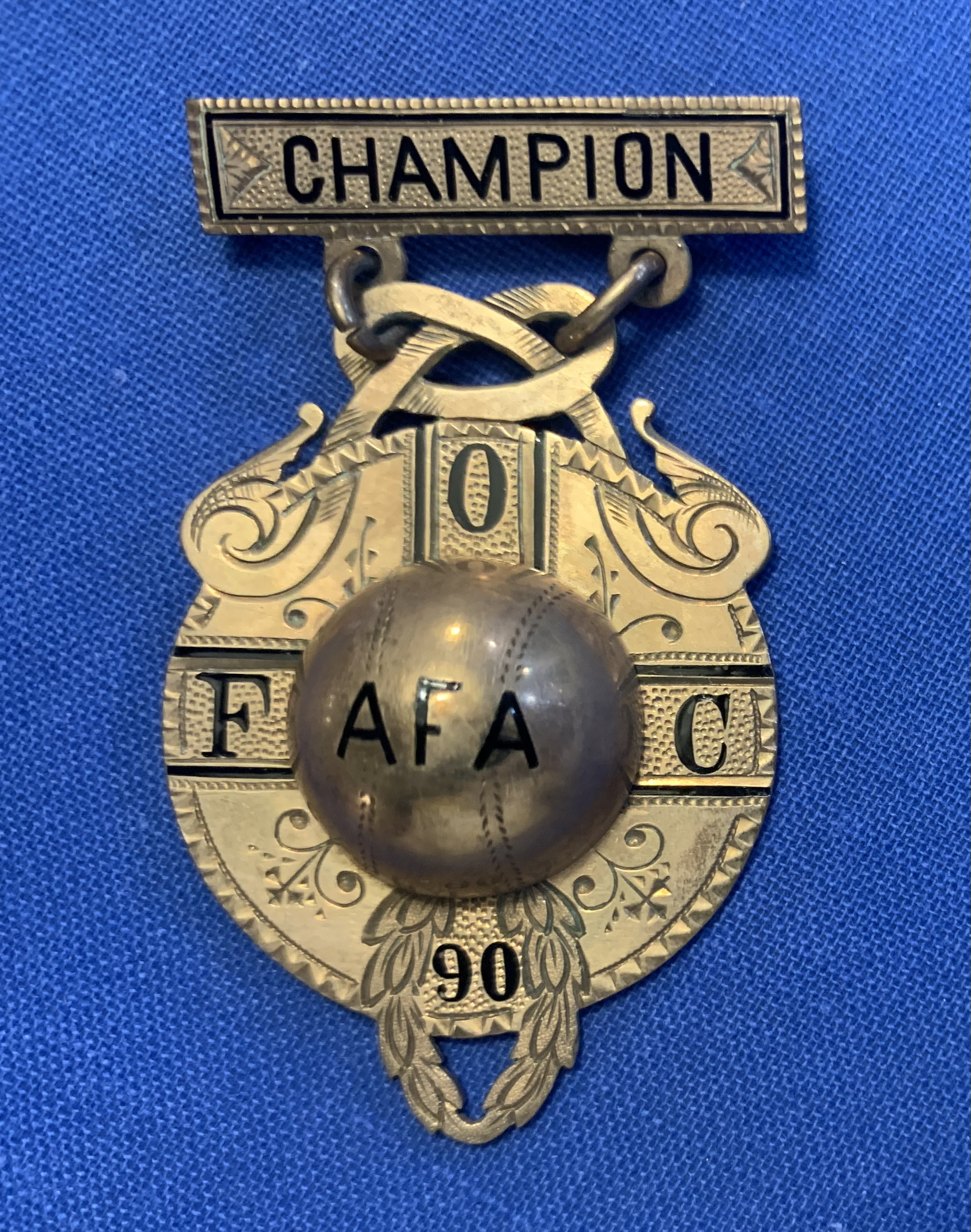
Player medal for the 1890 running of the American Cup competition

Within two years, this region began to widen to include teams in Pennsylvania and Massachusetts. Within a year of its founding, the AFA organized the first non-league cup in U.S. soccer history. Teams from New Jersey and Massachusetts dominated the first twelve years. Then in 1897, Philadelphia Manz brought the title to Pennsylvania for the first time. By the mid-1890's soccer in American was struggling due to New England going through difficult economic times.

As a result, the AFA suspended the cup from 1899 until 1906. By that time, the growth in the sport had led to a confusion of rules and standards. This led to a movement to create a truly national body to oversee U.S. soccer. Drawing on both its position as the oldest soccer organization and the status of the American Cup, the AFA argued that it should be the nationally recognized body. In October 1911, a competing body, the American Amateur Football Association (AAFA) was created. It quickly spread outside the northeast U.S. and began its own cup in 1912, the American Amateur Football Association Cup.

That year, both the AFA and AAFA applied for membership in FIFA, the international organizing body for soccer. In 1913, the AAFA gained an edge over the AFA when several AFA organizations moved to the AAFA. On April 5, 1913, the AAFA reorganized as the United States Football Association. FIFA quickly granted a provisional membership and USFA began exerting its influence on the sport. This led to the establishment of the National Challenge Cup that fall. The National Challenge Cup quickly grew to overshadow the American Cup. However, both cups were played simultaneously for the next ten years. Declining respect for the AFA led to the withdrawal of several associations from its cup in 1917. Further competition came in 1923 when USFA created the National Amateur Cup. That spelled the death knell for the American Cup. It played its last season in 1924.

== Trophy ==
The trophy was made by Tiffany & Co. and is described as "a very elegant sterling silver trophy. It is a vase about thirteen inches high surmounted by a Roman athlete. On either side is a foot ball and goal post, while in front on a large shield is the inscription".

== Champions ==
=== List of finals ===
Ed.	Season	Champion	Score	Runner-up
1	1884–85	Clark ONT (1)	1–0	New York F.B.C.
2	1885–86	Clark ONT (2)	3–1	Kearny Rangers
3	1886–87	Clark ONT (3)	3–2	Kearny Rangers
4	1887–88	Fall River Rovers (1)	5–1	Newark Almas
5	1888–89	Fall River Rovers (2)	4–0	Newark Caledonians
6	1889–90	Fall River Olympics (1)	4–3	Kearny Rovers
7	1890–91	Fall River East Ends (1)	3–1	Brooklyn Longfellows
8	1891–92	Fall River East Ends (2)	5–2	New York Thistle
9	1892–93	Pawtucket Free Wanderers (1)	3–1	New York Thistle
10	1893–94	Fall River Olympics (2)	4–1	Paterson True Blues
11	1894–95	Newark Caledonians (1)	4–0	Pawtucket Free Wanderers
12	1895–96	Paterson True Blues (1)	7–2	Fall River Olympics
13	1896–97	Philadelphia Manz (1)	5–2, 2–2	Paterson True Blues
14	1898	Arlington A.A. (1)	4–2	Kearny A.C.
–	1899–1905	(Not held)		
15	1906	West Hudson (1)	3–1	Paterson True Blues
16	1906–07	Clark (1)	4–0	Scottish Americans
17	1907–08	West Hudson (2)	3–2	Paterson True Blues
18	1908–09	Paterson True Blues (2)	2–1	East Newark Clark
19	1909–10	Tacony (1)	2–1	Scottish Americans
20	1910–11	Howard and Bullough (1)	1–1, 3–1	Philadelphia Hibernian
21	1911–12	West Hudson (3)	1–0	Paterson Rangers
22	1912–13	Paterson True Blues (3)	2–1	Tacony
23	1913–14	Bethlehem F.C. (1)	1–0	Tacony
24	1914–15	Scottish Americans (1)	1–0	Brooklyn Celtic
25	1915–16	Bethlehem Steel (2)	3–0	Scottish American
26	1916–17	Bethlehem Steel (3)	7–0	West Hudson A.A.
27	1917–18	Bethlehem Steel (4)	1–0	Babcock & Wilcox
28	1918–19	Bethlehem Steel (5)	2–0	Paterson F.C.
29	1919–20	Brooklyn Robins Dry Dock (1)	1–0	Bethlehem Steel
30	1920–21	Brooklyn Robins Dry Dock (2)	5–2	Fore River
–	1921–22	(Not held)		
31	1922–23	Fleisher Yarn (1)	2–0	J&P Coats
32	1923–24	Bethlehem Steel (6)	1–0	Fall River F.C.

=== Titles by club ===
Club	Titles	Winning years
Bethlehem Steel	6	1914, 1916, 1917, 1918, 1919, 1924
Clark O.N.T.	3	1885, 1886, 1887
West Hudson	3	1906, 1908, 1912
Paterson True Blues	3	1896, 1909, 1913
Fall River Rovers	2	1888, 1889
Fall River Olympics	2	1890, 1894
Fall River East Ends	2	1891, 1892
Brooklyn Robins Dry Dock	2	1920, 1921
