= American Football Association =

American Football Association may refer to:

- American Football Association (1884–1924), the first attempt in the United States to form an organizing association football body
- American Football Association (1977–1983), a minor professional American football league
