= Ansonia F.C. =

- Full name: Ansonia Cricket and Football Club
- Founded: 1885
- League: American Football Association

Ansonia F.C. was an early twentieth century U.S. soccer team from Ansonia, Connecticut.

== History ==
Ansonia was founded in 1885. They joined the American Football Association in 1887. Ansonia was knocked out in the first round of the 1887–88 American Cup. Ansonia returned to the American Cup in 1909–10, Losing to West Hudson A.A. in the first round. Some of the team's early achievements came in 1911 when it won the Connecticut State League and went to the semifinals of the 1910–11 American Cup. They lost the game, 3–1, to Philadelphia Hibernian when forced to play with only ten players. They brought eleven players to the game, but a fullback became ill before the game. In 1915, they went to the third round of the 1914–15 National Challenge Cup then dropped from the national scene until 1921 when they made a roaring comeback. That year, they won the Connecticut State League, lost in the final of the Connecticut State Football Association Spring Cup and went to the third round of the 1920–21 National Challenge Cup. They continued to see success in the Challenge Cup, going to the fourth round of the 1922–23 National Challenge Cup, third round of the 1923–24 National Challenge Cup and fourth round of the 1924–25 National Challenge Cup.

== Honors ==
League Championship

- Winner (2): 1911, 1921

Connecticut Football Association Spring Cup

- Runner Up (1): 1921
