= 1896–97 American Cup =

Soccer tournament

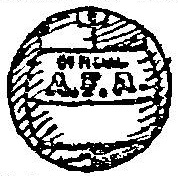

Tournament details
- Country: United States
- Teams: 9

Final positions
- Champions: Philadelphia Manz (1st title)
- Runners-up: True Blues

The 1896–97 American Cup was the thirteenth edition of the soccer tournament organized by the American Football Association. The Philadelphia Manz won this edition defeating defending champions Paterson True Blues after four attempts to complete the final. The committee for this season was H. Goldberg as president, W. Turner as vice president, William Robertson as Secretary, and Hugh Wilkie as Treasurer. The Amateur Athlete was made the official publication of the association. The 'Victor ball' by the Overman Wheel Company was chosen as the official ball for use in cup games. The association originally intended to have a league series and a cup tournament. They later dropped the league idea in favor of having each team play home and away games for the cup ties. If each team won a game, then the managers of each contesting team would flip a coin to see where the third game would take place. Players had to be registered 14 days before a game to be eligible to play.

== Participants ==
September 24 cover of Athlete

Name	City	State	Manager	Grounds
Athletics	Kearny	New Jersey	Flynn	Cosmopolitan Park
Caledonian	Newark	New Jersey	Swithemby	Cosmopolitan Park
O.N.T.	Newark	New Jersey	W.G.Rabone	Cosmopolitan Park
Scottish American	Newark	New Jersey	Spence	Wiedenmayer's Park
Crescent	Paterson	New Jersey	T.Grewcock	Lakeview
True Blues	Paterson	New Jersey	Yeates	Willard Park
International A.C.	New York	New York	Jamieson	Communipaw
Manz	Philadelphia	Pennsylvania	T.L.MacKenzie	Wayne Junction
Taftville	Taftville	Connecticut	Mr.	Taftville

== First round ==
The first round draw took place at the AFA meeting in Ball's Union Hall at East Newark, New Jersey on October 10, 1896. The Scottish Americans drew the bye. The first round to be finished before Nov. 21.

November 1896	International	–	O.N.T.	Kearny, NJ
2:30 PM				Stadium: Cosmopolitan Park

October 31, 1896	True Blues	3–1	Taftville	Lakeview, NJ
3:00 PM	Turner, 80'; Oldfield			Stadium: Olympic Park; Attendance: 500; Referee: James Lennox (Newark)
Note: True Blues: GK S.Simpson, FB W.Alexander, Binks, HB R.Hall, S.Findlay, J.Upton, FW L.Dodson, J.Oldfield, Robert Spencer, Harry Lauder, Tommie Turner. Taftville: G J.Brown, FB Gamble, Catterall, HB Baldwin, Wood, Ferguson, RW Smith, Montgomery, LW Nelson, Muttlewain, C W.Brown.

November 7, 1896	Taftville	3–5	True Blues	Rose of New England Wheel Club grounds
3:00 PM	McIlvane (1H); W. Brown 60'; Ferguson (2H)		(1H),,, (2H)	Referee: James Lennox (Newark)
Note: True Blues: GK S.Simpson, FB W.Alexander, Turner, HB R.Hall, S.Findlay, J.Upton, FW L.Dodson, J.Oldfield, Robert Spencer(c), Harry Lauder, Tommie Turner. Taftville: G J.Brown, FB Boyle, Seddon, HB Gamble, Woods(c), Hutchinson, FW Cottrell, Ferguson, Nelson, McIlvane, W.Brown.

October 31, 1896	Caledonian	0–7	Manz	East Newark, NJ
3:00 PM	Carmichael, (1H); Gold (1H); Cooper (2H); McCartney (2H); Kerr (2H); Steel (2H)			Stadium: Cosmopolitan Park; Referee: Mr. Humphreys (Internationals)
Note: Caledonians: GK Glynn, RFB Allan, LFB W.Mortimer, RHB R.Swithemby, CHB Joules, LHB Burns, RW Harty, Ross, C H.Singleton, LW Holden, Furfey. Manz: GK Beaumont, RFB Wason, LFB Brown, RHB Cooper, CHB Gold, LHB Richmond, RW Carmichael, McCartney, C Steel, LW Kerr, Smith.

November 7, 1896	Manz	w/o	Caledonian	PA
				Stadium: Wayne Junction
Note: Caledonians forfeited the second match.

November 7, 1896	Crescents	3–3	Athletics	Willard Park, NJ
3:00 PM	Bloor 7'; Flannery 48'; McGee 59'		Douglass 49', 67'; Stalter (1H)	Stadium: Tourist Oval; Attendance: 400; Referee: William Turner (Paterson)
Note: Crescents: GK J.Lees, FB R.Barr, H.McCrowe, HB White, Philibin, Vernon, RW R.Bloor, J.Band, C P.McGee, LW E.Grewcock, J.Flannery. Athletics: GK Arthur Hayes, FB William Flynn, Alfred Cutler, HB John McKance, Robert Taylor, Harry Singleton, FW William Salter, C.McGee, J.Nagle, David Douglas, William Marshall.

November 14, 1896	Athletics	8–0	Crescents	Newark, NJ
	Nagle,,,			Stadium: Cosmopolitan Park; Referee: Burns
Note: Crescents: GK J.Lees, FB R.Barr, H.McCrow, HB White, Philibin, Findley, RW R.Bloor, J.Band, C P.McGee, LW E.Grewcock, J.Flannery. Athletics: GK Arthur Hayes, FB William Flynn, Robert Taylor, HB John McKance, Alfred Cutler, Harry Singleton, FW William Salter, C.McGee, J.Nagle, Sampson, William Marshall.

November 21, 1896	Crescents	0–7	Athletics	Willard Park, NJ
3:00 PM			Salter 3' (1H); Nagle (1H),,, (2H)	Stadium: Tourist Oval; Referee: James Lennox (Newark)
Note: Crescents: GK J.Lees, FB R.Barr, Grewcock, HB White, Findley, H.McCrowe, RW R.Bloor, W.Bunce, C P.McGee, LW J.Flannery, W.Clarkson. Athletics: GK Arthur Hayes, FB William Flynn, Robert Taylor, HB John McKance, Alfred Cutler, Harry Singleton, FW William Salter, C.McGee, J.Nagle, Sampson, William Marshall.

== Second round ==
At the AFA meeting on November 28, 1896, at Union Hall in Newark, the committee drew for the semifinals pairing O.N.T. with Manz while the Scots and Athletics would playoff for the semifinal spot against the True Blues with five weeks to complete it.

December 12, 1896	Scottish Americans	2–7	Athletics	Newark, NJ
	McCullough (1H); Blackwood (2H)		Marshall, Nagle, Saulter; Singleton; Samson	Stadium: Wiedenmayer's Park; Attendance: 600; Referee: Mr. Kirk (Newark)
Note: Scots: GK Wildt, FB P.Wilson, P.Byrnes, HB G.Hopkins, T.Hopkins, R.McDonald, FW McCollough, Blackwood, Laverty, Paton, Gaffney. Athletics: GK Arthur Hayes, FB William Flynn, John McCance, HB Robert Taylor, Alfred Cutler, Harry Singleton, FW William Salter, C.McGee, J.Nagle, Harry Samson, William Marshall.

January 2, 1897	Athletics	4–3	Scottish Americans	East Newark, NJ
3:35 PM	Nagle 3', Salter; Flynn		McCollough; Paton; Gemmel	Stadium: Cosmopolitan Park; Referee: G. Winters (Centerville)
Note: Scots: GK T.Hopkins, FB P.Wilson, Blackwood, HB J.Hopkins, Galloway, R.McDonell, FW Gemmell, Laverty, C McCollough, RW Paton, Gaffney. Athletics: GK Hayes, FB Flynn, Sansom, HB Taylor, Cutler, McCance, RW Salter, Douglass, C J.Nagle, LW C.McGee, Marshall.

== Semifinals ==
The second leg of the True Blue-Athletic semifinal was protested by the Athletics who disagreed with the referee's decision to eject a player.The AFA sustained the protest and ordered the game replayed. The AFA later reversed the decision at an April 17 meeting at Newark. The committee seeing that it was wrong to allow the protest awarded the series to the True Blues.

January 16, 1897	Manz	6–1	O.N.T.	Wayne Junction, PA
3:30 PM	Kerr,, Carmichael; Steel,		Grundy (2H)	Stadium: Stenton; Referee: James Patrick (Brooklyn Wanderers)
Note: O.N.T.: GK Vrain, FB Winters, Kerr, HB Oliver, Christie, Montgomery(c), RW Neave, Hill, C Jones, LW Grundy, Clarke. Manz: GK Beaumont, FB Wilson, Wason, HB Gold, Morton, Richmond, LW McCartney, Carmichael, C Steel, RW Kerr, Colsey.

February 6, 1897	O.N.T.	1–6	Manz	Newark, NJ
3:30 PM	(1H)		10' (1H),,, (2H)	Stadium: Cosmopolitan Park; Attendance: 50; Referee: W.Flynn (Kearny Athletics)
Note: O.N.T.: GK Fitzpatrick, FB Winters, Kerr, HB Oliver, Christie, J.Jones, FW Neave, Hill, W.Jones, Montgomery(c), Clarke. Manz: GK Beaumont, FB Brown, Wason(c), HB Gold, Morton, Richmond, FW McCartney, Carmichael, Steel, Kerr, Colsey.

February 27, 1897	Athletics	3–4	True Blues	East Newark, NJ
3:00 PM	(1H); Brown (1H); Spencer (1H); Turner (1H)		5'; Salter (2H) (2H)	Stadium: Cosmopolitan Park; Attendance: 2000; Referee: Harry Humphries (Internationals)
Note: Athletics: GK A.Hayes, FB W.Flynn, R.Sansom, HB R.Taylor, Singleton, McCance, RW Salter, H.Sansom, C J.Nagle, LW H.McGee, W.Marshall. True Blues: GK S.Simpson, FB W.Alexander, T.Turner, HB R.Hall, S.Findlay, J.Upton, FW L.Dodson, J.Oldfield, Robert Spencer, R.Brown, Turner.

March 20, 1897	True Blues	7–4	Athletics	Paterson, NJ
3:00 PM	46' Spencer 46', 75' (2H) (1H), (2H)		McGee; Nagle 5', (1H)	Stadium: Willard Park; Attendance: 2000; Referee: Mr. Goode (Americus)
Note: Athletics: GK A.Hayes, FB W.Flynn, R.Sansom, HB Saggus, Singleton, McCance, RW Salter, Douglass, C J.Nagle, LW H.McGee(c), Taylor. True Blues: GK S.Simpson, FB W.Alexander, T.Turner, HB R.Hall, S.Findlay, J.Upton, FW L.Dodson, J.Oldfield, Robert Spencer, R.Brown, Turner.

April 3, 1897	True Blues	1–4	Athletics	Paterson, NJ
	(1H)		(1H); Salter (1H); Nagle (2H)	Stadium: Willard Park; Referee: Dave Wilson (Manz)
Note: Athletics: GK A.Hayes, FB W.Flynn, R.Sansom, HB Saggus, Singleton, McCance, FW Salter, Taylor, J.Nagle, H.McGee(c), Marshall. True Blues: GK S.Simpson, FB W.Alexander, T.Turner, HB R.Hall, S.Findlay, J.Upton, FW L.Dodson, J.Oldfield, Robert Spencer, R.Brown, Turner.

== Final ==
The True Blues of Paterson were entering their third AFA Cup final losing in 1894 and winning in 1896. The Manz team of Philadelphia reached the final having only one loss during the season, that being to the losing semifinalist Kearny Athletics on Christmas Day. The teams split the first two games requiring a deciding game at a neutral site. The third installment resulted in a tie at the end of regulation after which the referee called for 30 minutes additional time however the result remained level and the replay was set for May 22 at Newark.

April 24, 1897	Manz	4–2	True Blues	Wayne Junction, PA
3:15 PM	McCartney 30' (2H); Colsey (1H) Wilson (2H)		Spencer 5'; Turner 9'	Stadium: Stenton Field; Referee: J. Swithemby (Caledonians)
Note: True Blues: GK Simpson, FB W.Alexander, T.Turner, HB R.Hall, Finley, J.Upton, RW Dodson, James Oldfield, C Robert Spencer(c), LW Brown, T.A. Turner. Manz: GK Miller, FB Brown, Wason(c), HB Wilson, Morton, Richmond, RW McCartney, Carmichael, C Steel, LW Kerr, Colsey.

May 1, 1897	True Blues	3–1	Manz	Paterson, NJ
3:30 PM	Lauder 70'; Oldfield 75'; Dodson 85'		Colsey (2H)	Stadium: Willard Park; Referee: J. Swithemby (Caledonians)
Note: True Blues: GK Simpson, FB W.Alexander, Turner, HB R.Hall, Findlay, G.Eaton, RW Dodson, James Oldfield, C Robert Spencer, LW Brown, H.Lauder. Manz: GK Miller, FB Brown, Wason(c), HB Wilson, Morton, Richmond, RW McCartney, Carmichael, C Steel, LW Kerr, Colsey.

May 8, 1897	True Blues	2–2	Manz	East Newark, NJ
3:20 PM	(1H) (ET)		(1H) (ET)	Stadium: Cosmopolitan Park; Attendance: 1500; Referee: J. Swithemby (Caledonians)
Note: True Blues: GK Simpson, FB W.Alexander, Turner, HB R.Hall, Findley, Upton, RW Dodson, James Oldfield, C Robert Spencer, LW Brown, Lauder. Manz: GK Beaumont, FB Brown, Wason(c), HB Gold, McCartney, Richmond, LW Wilson, Carmichael, C Steel, RW Kerr, Colsey.

May 22, 1897	True Blues	2–5	Manz	East Newark, NJ
3:40 PM	R.Brown 11'; Dodson 25'		Wason 8'; Wilson 40'; 75', (2H)	Stadium: Cosmopolitan Park; Attendance: 1500; Referee: Alexander Jeffries(Pawtucket)
Note: True Blues: GK Simpson, FB W.Alexander, Turner, HB R.Hall, Findley, Upton, RW Dodson, James Oldfield, C Robert Spencer, LW R.Brown, Lauder. Manz: GK Beaumont, FB Brown, Wason(c), HB Gold, Colsey, Richmond, LW Wilson, Carmichael, C Steel, RW Kerr, McCartney.

== American Cup bracket ==
First Round
(New Jersey)	Newark Caledonians	0
(Pennsylvania)	Philadelphia Manz	7	w/o
(New York (state))	International A.C.
(New Jersey)	Clark O.N.T.	w/o
(New Jersey)	Scottish-American
bye
(New Jersey)	Paterson Cresent	3–0	0
(New Jersey)	Kearny Athletics	3-8	7
(New Jersey)	Paterson True Blues	3	5
(Connecticut)	Taftville	1	3

Second Round
(Pennsylvania)	Philadelphia Manz
bye
(New Jersey)	Clark O.N.T.
bye
(New Jersey)	Scottish-American	2	3
(New Jersey)	Kearny Athletics	7	4
(New Jersey)	Paterson True Blues
bye

Semifinals
(Pennsylvania)	Philadelphia Manz	6	6
(New Jersey)	Clark O.N.T.	1	1
(New Jersey)	Kearny Athletics	3	4-4
(New Jersey)	Paterson True Blues	4	7-1

Finals
(Pennsylvania)	Philadelphia Manz	4	1-2-5
(New Jersey)	Paterson True Blues	2	3-2-2

== See also ==
- 1896-97 NAFBL
