= 1888–89 American Cup =

Soccer tournament

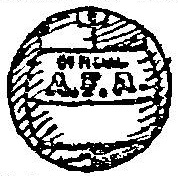

Tournament details
- Country: United States
- Teams: 15

Final positions
- Champions: Fall River Rovers (2nd title)
- Runners-up: Newark Caledonians

Tournament statistics
- Matches played: 17
- Goals scored: 73 (4.29 per match)

The 1888–89 American Cup was the fifth edition of the soccer tournament organized by the American Football Association. The Fall River Rovers won their second consecutive title by defeating the Newark Caledonians in the final.

== Participants ==
Newcomers to the tournament were the Paterson Rangers and Trenton Rovers. Absent was the Ansonia team while New York was defunct and the Kearny Rangers had amalgamated with ONT.

Ad for Rovers vs. O.N.T. match

| State | City | Team |
|---|---|---|
| Massachusetts | Fall River | East Ends |
| Massachusetts | Fall River | Olympics |
| Massachusetts | Fall River | Rover F.C. |
| New Jersey | Paterson | Paterson F.B.C. |
| New Jersey | Paterson | Paterson Rangers |
| New Jersey | Newark | Almas |
| New Jersey | Newark | Clark O.N.T. |
| New Jersey | Newark | Caledonian Club |
| New Jersey | Newark | Tiffany Rovers |
| New Jersey | Trenton | Trenton F.B.C. |
| New Jersey | Trenton | Trenton Rovers |
| New York | New York | Amateur League |
| New York | New York | Thistles |
| Rhode Island | Pawtucket | Free Wanderers |
| Rhode Island | Providence | Providence Athletics |

== First round ==
The Fall River Olympics drew a first round bye. The first game between the Almas and Paterson was not completed due to the ball bursting early in the second half. Paterson refused to continue so Alma claimed the contest. However, after a meeting of the delegates it was decided that the game should be replayed because the game had started without a referee in the first place. Clark ONT was awarded their replay match as a result of Trenton Rovers failure to appear.

| Paterson Rangers | w/o | Amateur League | Paterson, NJ |

| October 20, 1888 | Trenton | 1–3 | Thistle | Trenton, NJ |

| October 20, 1888 | Providence | 0–5 | Pawtucket | Providence, RI |
| | | | Mullarkey 1', Lennox 35', Sandilands | Stadium: Eagle street grounds Attendance: 1000 |
Note: Providence: GK Bailey, DF G.Clegg, McDonald, MF Davina, Cook, Start, FW Thorney, Cook, Axon, Brennan, Healabourn. Pawtucket: GK Watmouth, DF H.Stuart, A.Love, MF J.Dalton, F.Finn, D.Smith, FW Hardy, Mullarkey, Murray, Sandilands, Fd.Lennox.

| October 20, 1888 | Trenton Rovers | 0-0 | O.N.T. | Trenton, NJ |
| | | | | Stadium: East State Street grounds |

| October 27, 1888 | Fall River Rovers | 7-0 | East Ends | Fall River, MA |
| | 15'; 20'; 25'; 30'; 35'; 40'; 120' | | | Attendance: 800; Referee: Chapleau (Olympics) |
Note: Rovers: GK D.Shea, FB R.Harwood, F.Bradley, HB B.Fagan, H.Waring, J.Buckley, RW R.Bell, F.Cornell, LW, C.Duff, Wild, C Duff; East Ends: GK Ratcliffe, FB Woodcock, Harrington, HB Coupe, A.Bell, Foley, RW Farrell, Tobin, LW Buckley, Whitaker, C Beattie

| October 27, 1888 | Caledonians | 4-4 | Tiffany Rovers | ONT grounds |
| 3:30 PM |

| October 27, 1888 | Alma | 2-1 | Paterson | Shooting Park |

=== replays ===
| ONT | w/o | Trenton Rovers | Newark, NJ |

| November 6, 1888 | Alma | 3-0 | Paterson | Shooting Park |
| 3:30 PM | Walter Taylor 60'; 120'; J.Gray 120' | | | Attendance: 300; Referee: Henry Holden |
Note: Alma- G F.Farrow, DF G.Wright, Ely Morton, MF Frank Britchford, J.Hood, Robert Paterson, RW Walter Taylor, J.Curtin, LW H.Shaw, P.Brennan, C J.Gray(c); Paterson- G Isaac Sutton, FB John W.Smallwood, George Henshall, HB Thomas Evans, William Jones, James Henshall(c), RW William McDonald, Samuel Alberson, LW Thomas Turner, Samuel Saunders, C J.W.Warburton

| November 24, 1888 | Caledonians | 4-1 | Tiffany Rovers | ONT grounds |
| 3:00 PM | Hendry, J.Heron; W.Barr | | M.Downs | Referee: A.Craig |
Note: Caledonian- GK J.Thompson, DF J.Byrne, D.Gloak, MF W.Barr, R.McDonald, W.Hood, FW R.McWilliams, T.Hendry, R.Barr, W.Thornton, J.Heron. Tiffany- GK W.Healy, DF T.Crann, M.Flannery, MF D.McCune, E.Hinkley, J.Singleton, FW J.Jeffs, M.Downs, A.Hinkley, T.Flynn, J.Norton.

== Second round ==
Pawtucket and Thistles drew a second round bye.

| November 24, 1888 | Fall River Rovers | 4-0 | Olympics | Fall River, MA |
| 3:10 PM | Bruckshaw 30'; Cornell 60'; Bell 61'; Bruckshaw 66' | | | Stadium: Rovers’ grounds Attendance: 2500; Referee: H.Ball (RI Assoc. Pres.) |
Note: Rovers: GK Shea, DF Harwood, Fagan, MF Bradley, Waring, Lonsdale, FW Bell, Bruckshaw, Buckley, Bell, Cornell. Olympics: GK Brackell, DF Williamson, Lee, MF Tomlinson, Pilling, Brown, FW Hoctor, Corbet, Taylor, Ingham, Randall.

| December 8, 1888 | Alma | 0-3 | Caledonian | Shooting Park |
| | | | McCormack; Barr; Williamson | Referee: P.Hughes |
Note: Alma: GK F.Farrow, DF E.Morton, G.Wright, MF J.Britchford, J.Hood, R.Patterson, FW J.Gray, P.Brennan, H.Shaw, Walter Taylor, J.Smith. Caledonian: GK J.Thompson, DF G.Gloak, J.Brown, MF W.Barr, R.McDonald, W.Stalker, FW R.McWilliams, T.Hendry, J.McCormack, J.Williamson, R.Barr.

| December 22, 1888 | Paterson Rangers | 1-4 | O.N.T. | Paterson, NJ |
| | | | | Stadium: Olympic grounds |

== Third round ==
ONT drew a bye.

| December 25, 1888 | Thistle | 4-5 | Caledonian | ONT grounds |
| 10:30 AM | Barber, Jamieson, | | McWilliams; R.Barr; J.Hendry; McCormack, | Referee: W.Turner(Paterson Rovers) |
Note: Thistle- G Cameron, FB Russell, Patrick, HB Bailey, Harley, Kirk, RW Scott, Jameson, LW Walker, Barber, C Wind; Caledonian- G Thompson, FB Brown, Gloak, HB Barr, McDonald, Head, RW McWilliams, Hendry, LW R.Barr, Williamson, C McCormack

| January 12, 1889 | Pawtucket | 1-2 | Fall Rivers Rovers | Pawtucket, R.I. |
| 3:00 PM | 60' Mullarkey | | Cornell 5'; Bell 32' | Stadium: Dexter Street grounds Attendance: 6000; Referee: Eli Morton (Almas) |
Note: Pawtucket: GK James Hardy(c), FB Harry Stuart, Alexander Love, HB James Dalton, Frank Finn, David Smith LW William Mullarkey, M.Murray, RW Robert Sandilands, Edward Lennox, C John Stuart. Rovers: GK Dennis Shay, FB Richard Harwood, Bernard Fagan(c), HB Frank Bradley, Henry Waring, Richard Lonsdale, RW Robert Bell, Thomas Bruckshaw, LW Joseph Buckley, Charles Duff, C Frank Cornell.

== Semifinal ==
Caledonians drew a bye.

| March 2, 1889 | Fall River Rovers | 7-0 | O.N.T. | Fall River, MA |
| 3:45 PM | Bell 15', 51', Bruckshaw 17'; Cornell; Duff; Buckley | | | Stadium: Rovers’ ground Attendance: 3000; Referee: P.S. Morgan (Providence) |
Note: Rovers: GK D.Shay, FB R.Harwood, B.Fagan, HB F.Bradley, H.Waring, R.Lonsdale, RW R.Bell, T.Bruckshaw, LW J.Buckley, C.Duff, C F.Cornell; O.N.T.: GK P.Hughes, FB Line, E.Walker, HB Pallishaw, Jos.Swithumby, Alsop, RW Connelly, Fisher, LW John Swithumby, McAuley, C Campbell

== Final ==
| April 13, 1889 | Caledonian | 0–4 | Rovers | Newark, NJ |
| 4:00 PM | | | Buckley 12'; Bradley (1H); 63'; Bell | Stadium: O.N.T. grounds Attendance: 700; Referee: Mr. Craig (New York) |

| Caledonian | Rovers |

| GK | J. Thompson |
| FB | J. Brown |
| FB | D. Gloak |
| HB | W. Barr |
| HB | R. McDonald |
| HB | William Head |
| LW | T. Hendry |
| LW | R. McWilliams |
| C | J. McCormack |
| RW | J. Williamson |
| RW | T. Morgan |

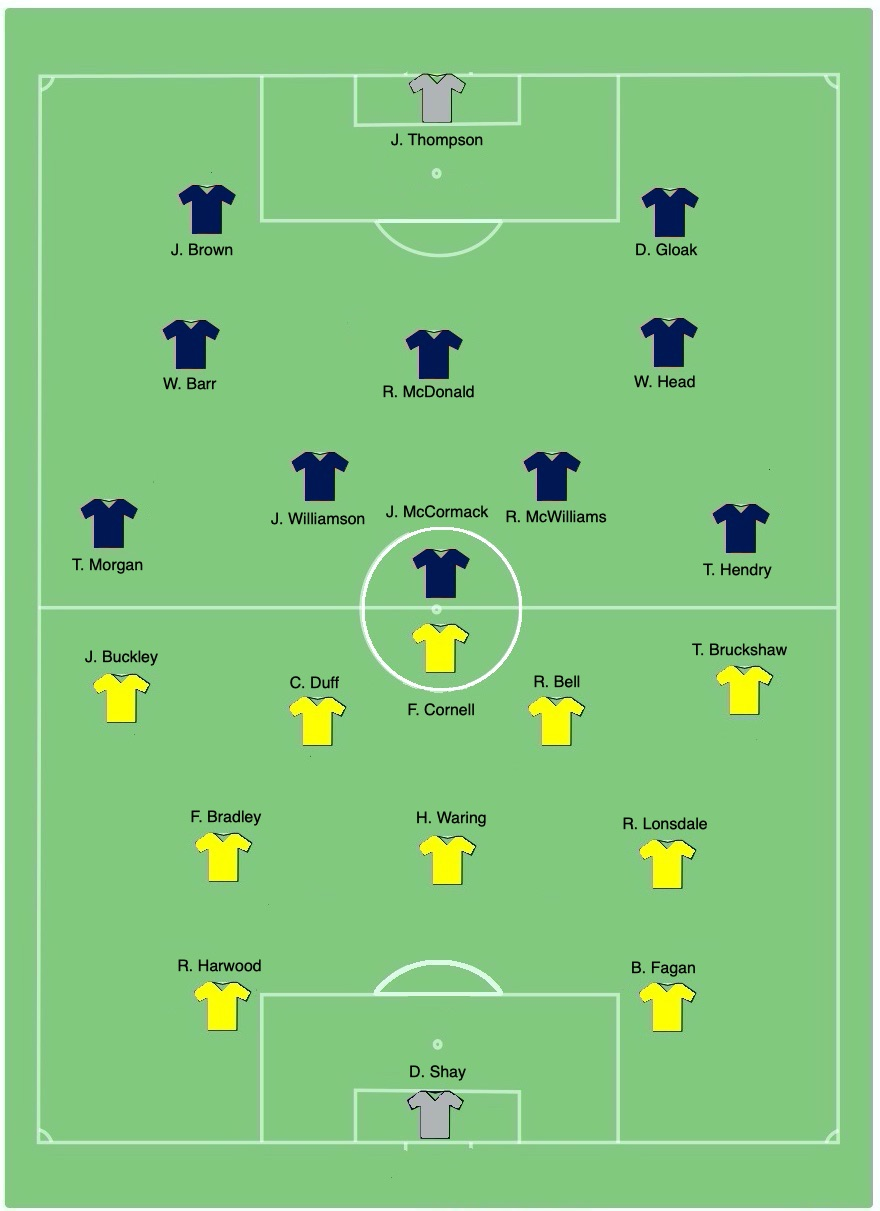

| GK | Dennis Shay |
| FB | Richard Harwood |
| FB | Bernard Fagan (c) |
| HB | Frank Bradley |
| HB | Henry Waring |
| HB | Richard Lonsdale |
| LW | Joseph Buckley |
| LW | Charles Duff |
| C | Frank Cornell |
| RW | Robert Bell |
| RW | Thomas Bruckshaw |
Manager:
Frank Miller

Match rules

- 90 minutes
- Replay if game ends in a draw

== American Cup bracket ==
First Round
(New Jersey) | Newark Almas | 2-3 (Note: First game not completed due to ball bursting)
(New Jersey) | Paterson | 1-0
(New Jersey) | Newark Caldonians | 4–4
(New Jersey) | Tiffany Rovers | 4–1
(New Jersey) | Trenton | 1
(New York (state)) | Thistles | 3
(Rhode Island) | Povidence Athletics | 0
(Rhode Island) | Pawtucket Free Wanderers | 5
(Massachusetts) | Fall River Rovers | 7
(Massachusetts) | Fall River East Ends | 0
(Massachusetts) | Fall River Olympics
bye
(New Jersey) | Paterson Rangers | w/o
(New York (state)) | Amateur League
(New Jersey) | Clark ONT | w/o (Note: First game ended 0–0, Trenton Rovers did not show up for Replay)
(New Jersey) | Trenton Rovers

Second Round
(New Jersey) | Newark Almas | 0
(New Jersey) | Caldonians | 3
(New York (state)) | Thistles
bye
(Rhode Island) | Pawtucket Free Wanderers
bye
(Massachusetts) | Fall River Rovers | 4
(Massachusetts) | Fall River Olympics | 0
(New Jersey) | Paterson Rangers | 1
(New Jersey) | Clark ONT | 4

Third Round
(New Jersey) | Newark Caldonians | 5
(New York (state)) | Thistles | 4
(Rhode Island) | Pawtucket Free Wanders | 1
(Massachusetts) | Fall River Rovers | 2
(New Jersey) | Clark ONT
bye

Semifinals
(New Jersey) | Newark Caldonians
bye
(Massachusetts) | Fall River Rovers | 7
(New Jersey) | Clark ONT | 0

Finals
(New Jersey) | Newark Caldonians | 0
(Massachusetts) | Fall River Rovers | 4

Notes;

== Champions ==
American Football Association
Challenge Cup
Rover F.C.
Second Title

== Sources ==
- Outing
- National Police Gazette
- New York Herald
- New York Times
- Spirit of the Times
- Trenton Times
- Fall River Herald
- Daily Advertiser
- Evening News
- Sunday Call
