= 1884–85 American Cup =

Soccer tournament

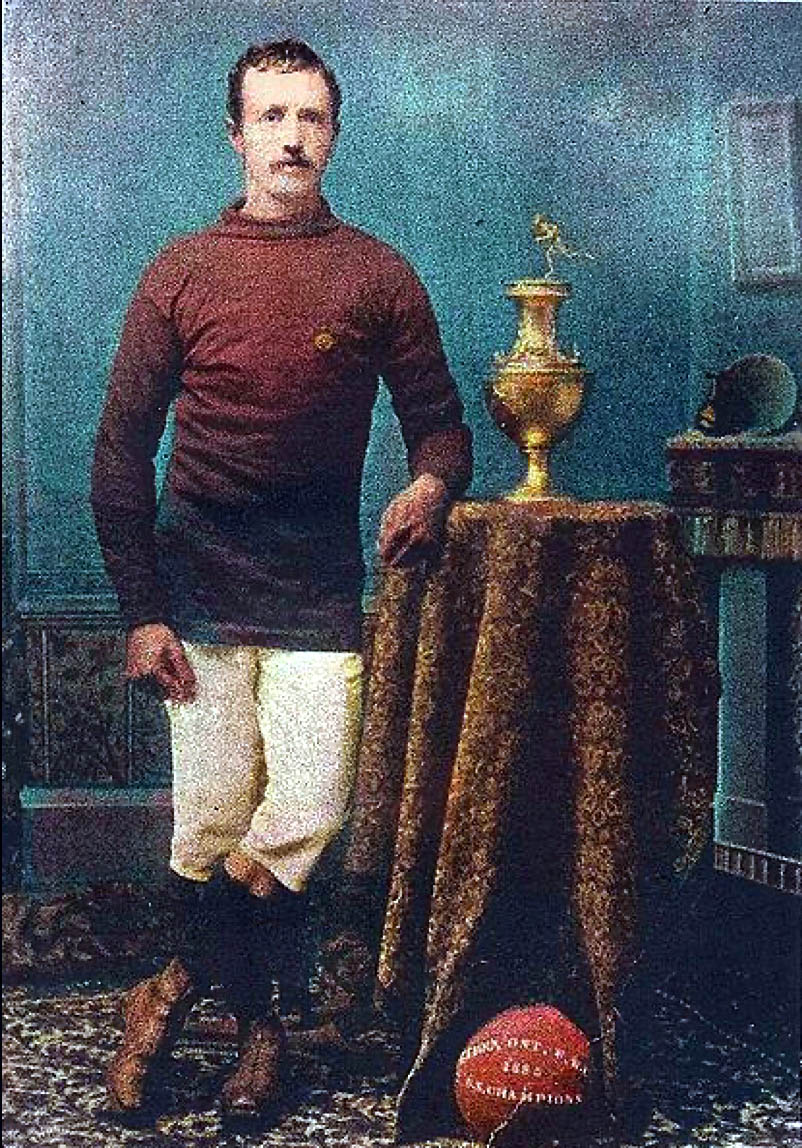
- Harry Holden with the trophy

Tournament details
- Country: United States
- Dates: October 25, 1884 – April 25, 1885
- Teams: 6

Final positions
- Champions: Clark O.N.T. (1st title)
- Runners-up: New York

Tournament statistics
- Matches played: 6
- Goals scored: 20 (3.33 per match)

The 1884–85 American Cup was the inaugural edition of this tournament staged by the American Football Association. Clark O.N.T. was the champion.

== History ==
Six teams contended for the first edition played in the 1884–85 season. Five of the teams were from New Jersey and one from New York. The Association and the tournament itself were the result of the success the game had in the previous winter and fall and despite all the teams coming from a relatively limited area it was anticipated that the game would undoubtedly grow. The completion of the trophy was announced several days later. The trophy was exhibited in several places around Newark, Paterson and New York. The trophy, originally valued at $200, was described as having "a neat design in silver and gold appropriate figures of foot ballists being engraved on it". Clark ONT became the first winners of the trophy along with the purse of $150.

== Participants ==
Clark ONT, established in 1883, played at their association ground in the rear of the Kearny Mills. They wore crimson jerseys, white knickerbockers, and crimson stockings. Paterson wore blue and white striped jerseys, white knickerbockers, and blue stockings. The Domestics, also having blue and white for colors, were composed of employees of the Domestic Manufacturing Company and played at their counterparts baseball ground at Williams Hill. However, in March 1885 the Domestic company no longer allowed the baseball club to use that name so they simply became the Newark baseball club and their field also became Newark baseball grounds aka Emmett street grounds. The Kearny Rangers were a football and cricket club established in 1883 with navy shirts and white shorts. The participants hailing from three different cities were as follows:

State	City	Team
New Jersey	Paterson	Caldonian Thistle Club
New Jersey	Paterson	Paterson F.B.C.
New Jersey	Newark	Clark O.N.T.
New Jersey	Newark	Domestic
New Jersey	Kearny	Kearny Rangers
New York	New York	New York F.B.C.

== Venues ==
New Jersey
O.N.T. Grounds	1884–85 American Cup is located in New Jersey
Capacity:	1884–85 American Cup is located in New Jersey
Domestic Grounds	1884–85 American Cup is located in New Jersey
Capacity:	1884–85 American Cup is located in New Jersey
Olympic Grounds	1884–85 American Cup is located in New Jersey
Capacity:	1884–85 American Cup is located in New Jersey

== First round ==
The draw for the first round was reported in newspapers on October 1, 1884, after being conducted by the clubs' secretaries at Paterson.

October 25, 1884	Clark O.N.T.	2–0	Domestic	Kearny, New Jersey
3:00 PM	McGurk; Spillane			Stadium: O.N.T. AA Grounds; Referee: James Lennox
Note: ONT: GK J. Douglas, DF A. Kenworthy, E. Sargent, MF Joe Swithemby, James Howarth, T. Smith, FW J. Spillane, J. Mitchell, Jack Swithemby, James McGurk, William Clark Jr.(c); Domestic: GK W. Hollenbeck, DF J. Corby, F. Ward, MF C. Riker, L. Conklin, FW C. Fairchild, R.O'Toole, H.Chadwick(c), T. Bock, T. Butchford, J.Utter.

November 1, 1884	Kearny Rangers	3–2	Caledonian Thistle	Newark, New Jersey
4:00 PM				Stadium: Domestic Baseball Grounds

November 1, 1884	New York	5–0	Paterson	Hoboken, New Jersey

== Second round ==
The secretaries of the remaining three teams met on November 8 in East Newark to make the second round draw which resulted in the Rangers being pitted against New York on Thanksgiving Day with the winner to meet ONT in the final round.

November 27, 1884	Kearny Rangers	0–4	New York	Newark, New Jersey
2:30 PM				Stadium: Domestic Baseball Grounds
Note: Kearny Rangers: GK D. Ferguson, DF W. Hood, D. Morris, MF John Hood, James Lennox(c), FW R. Raeburn, J. Hill, A. Bolton, H. Ashley, W. Taylor, J.Milner.

== Final round ==
The final was played in the snow on Valentine's Day. ONT emerged victorious by a score of 2–1, however captain Mitchell of New York entered a protest indicating that some of the ONT players were not members of the club and that the goal posts were not regulation size. The AFA ordered the game replayed at Paterson.

February 14, 1885	Clark O.N.T.	2–1	New York	Newark, New Jersey
3:00 PM	Jack Swithemby 15'; McGurck 40'		D. Sinclair 80'	Stadium: Emmet Street Grounds; Referee: James Lennox
Note: O.N.T.: GK Patrick Hughes, FB Harry Holden, J. Donnelly, HB Joe Swithemby, James Howarth, T. Smith, FW P. Garron, William Thornton, Jack Swithemby(c), Joseph Swarbrick, James McGurk. New York: GK T. Walker, DF A. Johnston, F. Marsterton, MF W. Sinclair, J. Gold, FW A.Mitchell(c), A. Young, J. Lowe, J. Grant, D. Sinclair, D.McNeil.

=== replay ===
April 25, 1885	Clark O.N.T.	1–0	New York	Paterson, NJ
4:00 PM	Swithemby 44'			Stadium: Olympic grounds

Clark O.N.T.	New York

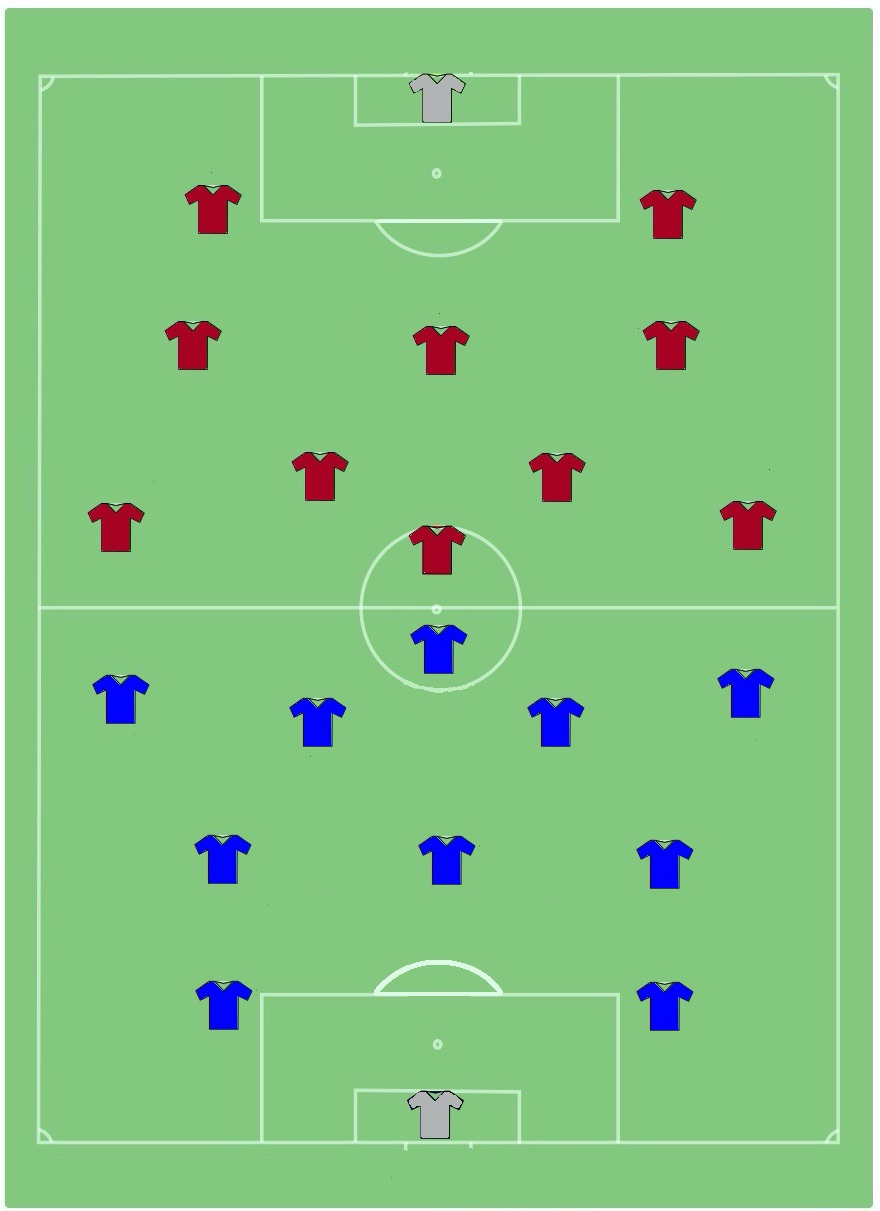

Match rules

- 90 minutes
- Replay if game ends in a draw

== American Cup Bracket ==
Home teams listed on top of bracket

First Round
(New Jersey)	Clark O.N.T.	2
(New Jersey)	Domestics	0
(New Jersey)	Kearny Rangers	3
(New Jersey)	Caledonian Thistle	2
(New York (state))	New York F.B.C.	5
(New Jersey)	Paterson F.B.C.	0

Second Round
(New Jersey)	Clark O.N.T.
bye
(New Jersey)	Kearny Rangers	0
(New York (state))	New York F.B.C.	4

Finals
(New Jersey)	Clark O.N.T.	2–1 (Note: replay after New York protested first match)
(New York (state))	New York F.B.C.	1–0

== Champions ==
American Football Association
Challenge Cup
First Title

== Sources ==
- National Police Gazette
- New York Herald
- The New York Sun
- Spirit of the Times
- Morning Register
- Daily Advertiser
- Evening News
- Sunday Call
