= 1886–87 American Cup =

Soccer tournament

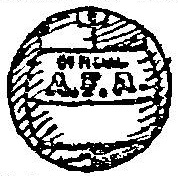

Tournament details
- Country: United States
- Date: October 23, 1886 – April 9, 1887
- Teams: 9

Final positions
- Champions: Clark O.N.T. (3rd title)
- Runners-up: Kearny Rangers

Tournament statistics
- Matches played: 9
- Goals scored: 40 (4.44 per match)

The 1886–87 American Cup was the third edition of the soccer tournament organized by the American Football Association. For the third time since its inception the Clark O.N.T.'s were the champions.

== Participants ==
The tournament had now increased to nine teams with Newark boasting four entries including the newcomers Tiffany Rovers. The Rovers, established in 1885, played out of Caledonian Park and wore amber and black striped jerseys with white knickerbockers.

State	City	Team
New Jersey	Paterson	Paterson F.B.C.
New Jersey	Newark	Almas
New Jersey	Newark	Clark O.N.T.
New Jersey	Newark	Tiffany Rovers
New Jersey	Kearny	Kearny Rangers
New Jersey	Trenton	Trenton F.B.C.
New York	New York	New York F.B.C.
New York	New York	New York Rovers
New York	New York	Pilgrims
New York	New York	West Side

== First round ==
Pilgrims drew a bye

October 23, 1886	Kearney Rangers	4–0	Tiffany Rovers	East Newark
3:30 PM	Gloak 15'; Williams 22'; C.Gray 57'; Walter Taylor			Stadium: ONT grounds Referee: J.Joules
Note: Rangers: GK J.Clynch, DF J.McKell, James Chapman, MF William Allsop, J.Hearn, D.Morris, FW William Taylor, J.Williams, George Sergeant, D.Gloak, Walter Taylor(c). Rovers: GK G.Gray, DF T.Crann, J.Shelby, MF J.McCullough, F.Hatfield, D.O'Mara, FW C.Gray, A.Ringley, W.Houston, W.Hinchley, J.Norton.

October 30, 1886	Clark O.N.T.	4–2	Alma	Newark, New Jersey
	Jack Swithenby; McGurck; Jack Swithenby 85'; J.Hood 87'		Lucas(Lennox); Gray	Stadium: Frelinghuyson grounds Referee: A.Turner(Paterson)
Note: O.N.T.: Patrick Hughes, Harry Holden, A.Pallister, J.Dockray, Joe Swithenby(c), James Howarth, J.Hood, Jack Swithenby, James McGurck, J.Swarbrick, J.Connolly. Almas: Frank Farrow, C.Moore, George Wright, E.Morton, R.Patterson, F.Britchtord, Joseph Lucas, George Curtin(c), E.P.Garren, John Gray, T.Faulkeley.

October 30, 1886	New York	5–0	West Side	New York
				Stadium: Oak Point

October 30, 1886	Paterson	1–1	Trenton	Paterson, New Jersey
3:30 PM	60'		10'	Stadium: Olympic grounds
Note: Paterson: GK Dowey, DF B.Henshall(c), J.Hall, MF G.Henshall, E.Gaskell, J.Henshall, FW W.Wyatt, William Turner, J.W.Warburton, S.Wardle, R.McWilliams. Trenton: GK W.Bradshaw, DF R.Rhodes, Holowan, MF T.McNicol, T.Baddeley, J.James, FW J.Bradshaw, E.Naylor, E.Ward, A.Dearden, D.Baggeley.

=== replay ===
November 25, 1886	Trenton	3–2	Paterson	Trenton, New Jersey
				Stadium: Cricket Grounds
Note: Trenton: GK Hart Everingham, DF Hullman, Rhodes, MF McNicol(c), James, Baddeley, FW Openshaw, Ward, Naylor, Baggeley, Deardon.

== Second round ==
ONT draws a bye.

December 18, 1886	Pilgrims	1–3	Kearny Rangers

December 25, 1886	Trenton	3–1	New York	Trenton, New Jersey
2:30 PM				Stadium: East State St grounds Attendance: 700; Referee: R.L.Craig (AFA Pres.)
Note: Trenton: GK Hart Everingham, DF Hullman, Rhodes, MF McNicol(c), James, Baddeley, FW Ward, Openshaw, Naylor, Baggeley, Deardon.

== Semifinal round ==
Kearny Rangers draw a bye.

February 19, 1887	O.N.T.	5–0	Trenton	New Jersey
3:15 PM	Swarbrick 44'; Brooks; McGurck; Donnelly; Howarth			Stadium: ONT grounds Newark; Referee: J.Grant
Note: O.N.T.: Patrick Hughes, Harry Holden, A.Patterson, J.Swithemby, L.Dockray, James Howarth, James McGurck, J.Brooks, R.Donnelly, Joseph Swarbrick, J.Swithemby. Trenton: H.Evenham, G.Holman, R.Rhodes, A.MacNicol, J.James, T.Bradley, E.Openshaw, D.Bagley, A.Reardon, E.Naylor, J.Mart.

== Final round ==
April 9, 1887	Clark O.N.T.	3–2	Kearny Rangers	Newark, NJ
3:40 PM	Jack Swithemby 40'; Swarbrick 55'; Swarbrick		Gloak 45'; Sargent	Stadium: Frelinghuysen grounds Attendance: 600; Referee: T. Narg (New York)

Clark O.N.T.	Kearny Rangers

GK	Patrick Hughes
FB	Harry Holden
FB	Pallister
HB	James Howarth
HB	Joe Swithemby
HB	Dockray
LW	James McGurk
LW	Harry Fisher
C	Jack Swithemby
RW	J. Conley
RW	Joseph Swarbrick

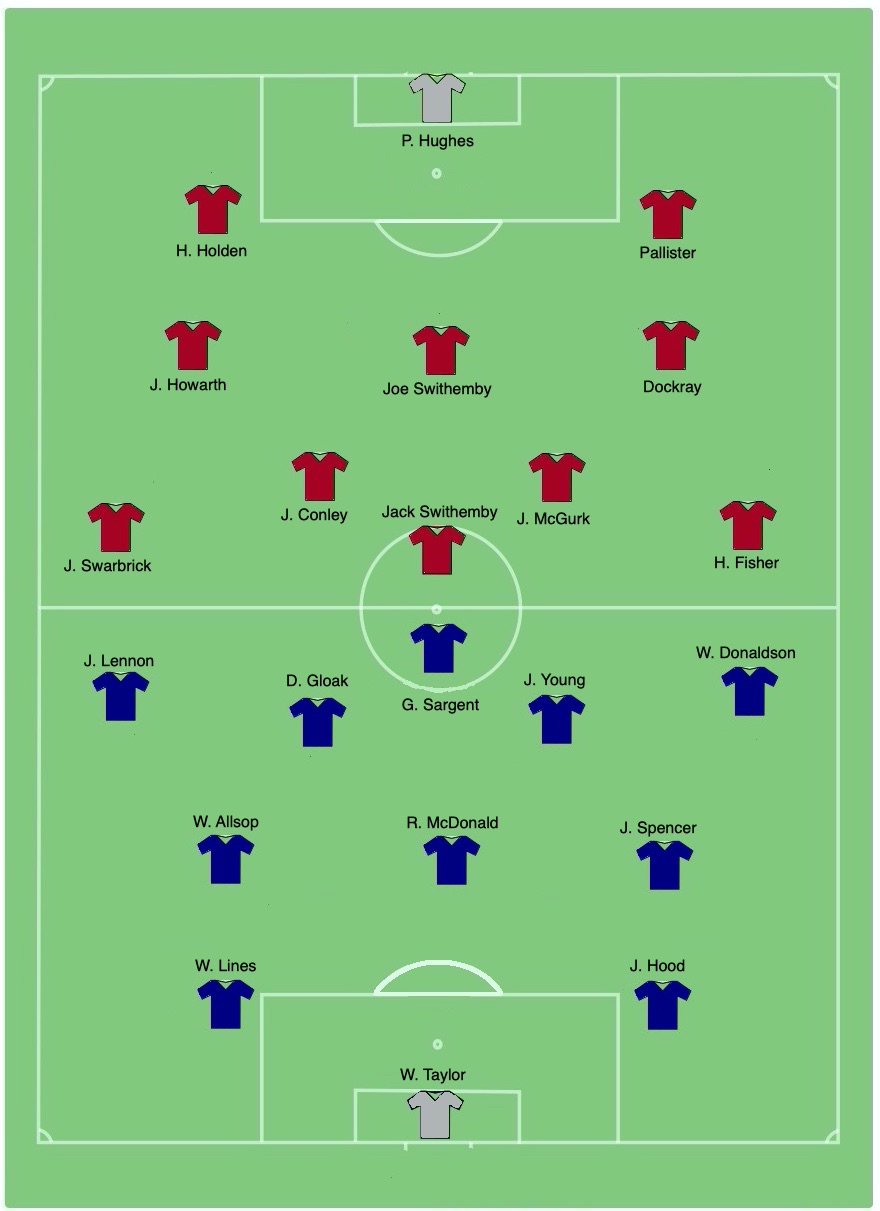

GK	W. Taylor (c)
FB	William Lines
FB	J. Hood
HB	William Allsop
HB	Roderic McDonald
HB	J. Spencer
LW	J. Lennon
LW	D. Gloak
C	George Sargent
RW	J. Young
RW	W. Donaldson

Umpires:
O'Toole (Caledonians)
Lang (Tiffany Rovers)

Match rules

- 90 minutes
- Replay if game ends in a draw

== American Cup bracket ==
First Round
(New Jersey)	Alma	2
(New Jersey)	Clark O.N.T.	4
(New Jersey)	Paterson	1-2
(New Jersey)	Trenton	1-3
(New York (state))	New York	5
(New York (state))	West Side	0
(New York (state))	Pilgrims
bye
(New Jersey)	Kearny Rangers	4
(New Jersey)	Tiffany Rovers	0

Second Round
(New Jersey)	Clark O.N.T.
bye
(New Jersey)	Trenton	3
(New York (state))	New York	1
(New York (state))	Pilgrims	1
(New Jersey)	Kearny Rangers	3

Semifinal
(New Jersey)	Clark O.N.T.	5
(New Jersey)	Trenton	0
(New Jersey)	Kearny Rangers
bye

Final
(New Jersey)	Clark O.N.T.	3
(New Jersey)	Kearny Rangers	2

== Champions ==
American Football Association
Challenge Cup
Third Title

== Sources ==
- Outing
- National Police Gazette
- New York Herald
- The New York Sun
- Spirit of the Times
- Trenton Times
- Morning Register
- Daily Advertiser
- Evening News
- Sunday Call
