= 1891–92 American Cup =

Soccer tournament

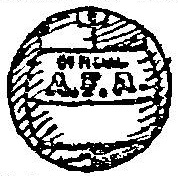

Tournament details
- Country: United States
- Teams: 20

Final positions
- Champions: East Ends (2nd title)
- Runners-up: NY Thistle

Tournament statistics
- Matches played: 23
- Goals scored: 130 (5.65 per match)

The 1891–92 American Cup was the eighth edition of the soccer tournament organized by the American Football Association. The Fall River East Ends won their second title in succession by overcoming the New York Thistles in the final. The Challenge Cup committee elected by the AFA were Robert Miller of O.N.T. as president, James Henderson of Brooklyn Nonpareil as vice president, Thomas B. Hood of Pawtucket as Secretary, and John Lang of Fall River as Treasurer.

== Entrants ==
Circuit	State	City	Team
Western	New Jersey	Newark	Clark O.N.T.
Western	New Jersey	Newark	Newark Caledonian
Western	New Jersey	Paterson	Paterson F.B.C.
Western	New Jersey	Paterson	Thistle
Western	New Jersey	Paterson	True Blues
Western	New Jersey	Trenton	Trenton F.B.C.
Western	New York	Brooklyn	Atlantics
Western	New York	Brooklyn	Brooklyn
Western	New York	Brooklyn	Comrades
Western	New York	Brooklyn	Longfellows
Western	New York	Brooklyn	Nonpareils
Western	New York	New York	Thistle
Eastern	Massachusetts	Fall River	Canonicuts
Eastern	Massachusetts	Fall River	Fall River East Ends
Eastern	Massachusetts	Fall River	Fall River Olympics
Eastern	Massachusetts	Fall River	Fall River Rovers
Eastern	Massachusetts	Quincy	Quincy
Eastern	Rhode Island	Rhode Island	Pawtucket Free Wanderers
Eastern	Rhode Island	Providence	Metropole A.A.
Eastern	Vermont	Barre	Barre Rangers

== First round ==
The first round draw took place at the AFA meeting in Newark, New Jersey on September 13, 1891. The games of the first round were scheduled to be played on or before the last Saturday in October. The replay of the Canonicut-Metrople match was protested on account of darkness. The subsequent replay was tied, however the tie was not replayed because Metropole, by then, had disbanded. The Brooklyn-Thistle replay was also protested and resolved with a third encounter. The Free Wanderers and East Ends also required three tries to complete the round. The first match was called on account of rough play and ordered replayed on neutral ground while the second match was protested regarding a disputed goal.

October 18, 1891	NY Thistles	2–2	Brooklyn	Ridgewood, LI
3:30 PM	Enwistle 15'; Flynn		M.Gorevin 17'; C.Gorevin	Stadium: Nonpareil FC grounds Attendance: 500; Referee: William Turner(Paterson Thistle)
Note: Thistle: G Cameron, FB Flynn, Noble, HB Purvis, Enwistle, Head, FW Jameson, Scott, Adams, Fife, Frazier. Brooklyn: G M.Gorevin(c), FB C.Gorevin, Thompson, HB Simm, McLarne, Nork, FW Smith, Neil, Paul, Crabb, Hinshaw.

October 24, 1891	Caledonians	3–1	Trenton	Newark, NJ
	Morgan, Barr		A. Cartlidge	Stadium: Kearny Athletic Ground; Referee: J.Henderson(Nonpareils)
Note: Trenton: GK J.Kearns, FB W.Duffy, G.Allman, HB R.McDavitt, W.Cooper, J.Gallagher, RW R.Rhodes, G.Harvey, C Jim Irwin, LW A.Cartlidge, J.Birch. Caledonian: GK W.Shaw, FB John Brown, F.McDonald, HB Bennett(c), Crann, F.Britchford, RW H.Fisher, John Singleton, C William Barr, LW John Swithemby, Ed Morgan, Reserves R.Paterson, J.Burns, W,Clark.

October 25, 1891	Longfellows	9–0	Atlantics	Brooklyn, NY
Note: Longfellows: GK Gnider, FB Foy, Leonard, HB McConnell, Neave, McCallion, RW R.Rhodes, G.Harvey, C J.Green, LW Boyle, F.Gammell. Atlantics: GK Graham, FB Achon, Wayne, HB Paterson, North, Adams, RW Scott, Bailey, C J.Dunbar, LW Dumbart, Thornton.

October 31, 1891	O.N.T.	w/o	Nonpareil	Kearny, NJ

October 31, 1891	Paterson	2–3	True Blues	Paterson, NJ
	(2H); J.Counsell		E.Ackerman; W.McDonald; W.Neild	Stadium: Clifton race track Referee: Mr. W.Turner
Note: Paterson: GK S.Simpson, FB J.Henshall(c), D.Grant, HB R.Sinclair, J.Worseley, J.T.Robinson, FW Unwin, Fiddler, S.Turner, W.Clarkson, J.Counsell. True Blues: GK S.Templeton, FB J.Lockman(c), W.Pearson, HB F.Binks, C.Alsopp, E.Ackerman, FW W.Nield, J.Bond, T.Nield, W.Vernon, W.McDonald, A.Bray.

November 22, 1891	Paterson Thistle	8–1	Comrades	Haledon, NJ
				Stadium: Paterson Recreation Company

October 17, 1891	Metropole	3–3	Canonicuts	Pawtucket, RI
	Cloude; McDonald; Boyer		Bennett (1H); Levecque	Stadium: Dexter Street grounds Referee: Alexander Love
Note: Metropole: GK Croan, FB M. Muirhead, Boyer, HB Manion, Tom Muirhead, Johnson, RW Hellborn, Fields, C McDonald, LW Murray, Cloud. Conanicuts: GK Farrell, FB Dillon, Ryan, HB Gillette, Morgan, Donovan, RW Bennett, (absent), C McNulty, LW Griffin, Levecque.

October 24, 1891	Olympics	3–3	Rovers	Fall River, MA
	Stewart (o.g.); Randall; Russell 72', 74'		Kenny 4'; M.Harrington 62'	Stadium: Olympic grounds Attendance: 1000; Referee: Cook (Providence)

October 31, 1891	Free Wanderers	0–2	East Ends	Dexter street grounds
3:15 PM			Tobin 5'; Borden 30'	Attendance: 3000; Referee: James Henderson(Nonpareils)
Note: Wanderers: GK McFarland, FB Read, Fagan(c), HB A.Jenkins, Guy, Attewell, RW McCann, Davis, C Howard, LW O'Neil, Smith. East Ends: GK Irving, FB Morris, Hargeaves, HB Scott(c), Stanton, Hughes, RW Philbin, Tobin, C Whitehead, LW Sunderland, Borden.

1891	Barre Rangers	–	Quincy

=== replays ===
October 31, 1891	Canonicuts	4–2	Metropole	Fall River, MA
4:15 PM	Hoctor; Bennett; Levecque; 55'		(1H) (2H)	Stadium: North End grounds Attendance: 500; Referee: H. Darlington
Note: Metropole: GK Croan, FB M. Muirhead, Bowyer, HB Manion, Tom Muirhead, Johnson, RW Fisk, Cook, C McDonald, LW Murray, Hellborne. Conanicuts: GK Farrell, FB Cusick, Ryan, HB Dillon, Culligan, Kearney, RW Bennett, Hoctor, C Stanton, LW McNulty, Levecque.

November 1, 1891	Brooklyn	0–2	NY Thistles	Ridgewood, LI
3:45 PM			10' (2H)	Referee: A. Johnson (Fall River)
Note: Thistle: G Cameron, FB Patrick, Ritchie, HB Flynn, Entwistle, Noble, RW Jamieson, Robertson, C Adams, LW Purvis, Frazer. Brooklyn: G M.Gorvin(c), FB C.Gorvin, Thompson, HB Crabb, Farrell, Henshaw, RW North, McLaren, LW Smith, Paul, C Patterson.

November 21, 1891	Rovers	4–3	Olympics	Fall River, MA
3:20 PM	M.Harrington 55' (1H); 85'; Gavan 87'		(1H); Booth 53' (2H)	Stadium: Rovers’ grounds Attendance: 3200; Referee: Hood (Newark)
Note: Rovers: G Simester, FB H.Adams, King, HB Adams, Puleston, Culligan, RW Farrell, J.Harrington, C Harrington, LW Kenny, Gavan. Olympics: G Connell, FB Stuart, Lee, HB Burgess, Finn, Tomlinson, RW Pilling, Booth, LW Randell(c), Russell, C Miller.

November 21, 1891	East Ends	1–0	Free Wanderers	New Bedford, MA
	84'			Stadium: Cove street grounds Attendance: 1000; Referee: Mr. Craig (O.N.T.)
Note: Wanderers: GK McFarlane, FB Read, Fagan(c), HB McConnell, Guy, Sam Jenkins, RW McCann, Davis, C A.Jenkins, LW O'Neil, Mullarkey. East Ends: GK Irving, FB Morris, Hargraves, HB Scott(c), Stanton, Hughes, RW Philbin, Tobin, C Whitehead, LW Sunderland, Bowden, Reserves McGuigan, Shorrocks, Schofield, Thomas.

November 21, 1891	Metropole	3–3	Canonicuts	Pawtucket, RI
3:30 PM	Smith; Hellborn		Bennett	Stadium: Dexter street grounds Referee: George Sloan
Note: Metropole: GK Manion, FB M. Muirhead, Bowyer, HB Brown, Tom Muirhead, Johnson, RW Hellborn, Cash, C McDonald, LW Murray, Smith. Conanicuts: GK Farrell, FB Morgan, Ryan, HB Gillet, Dillon, Oldham, RW Bennett, Hoctor, C Puleston, LW McNulty, Leveque.

November 28, 1891	NY Thistles	4–3	Brooklyn
	Frazer; Patrick (o.g.); Jamieson,,		North,
Note: Thistle: G Cameron, FB Flynn, Patrick, HB Duncan, Entwistle, Millen, RW Jamison, Scott, C Adams, LW Purvis, Frazer. Brooklyn: G M.Gorevin, FB C.Gorevin, Iszet, HB Court, McLaren, McGuire, RW H.North, C Farrell, Paul, LW Neil, Smith.

December 19, 1891	Free Wanderers	1–3	East Ends	New Bedford, MA
3:00 PM	O'Neil (1H)		Sunderland (1H); Stanton (2H); Whitehead (2H)	Stadium: Cove street grounds Attendance: 800; Referee: Edward Walker (O.N.T.)
Note: Wanderers: GK McFarlane, FB Read, Fagan(c), HB McConnell, Guy, Sam Jenkins, RW McCann, Davis, C A.Jenkins, LW O'Neil, Montgomery. East Ends: GK Irving, FB Morris, Hargraves, HB Scott(c), Philbin, Hughes, RW Stanton, Tobin, C Whitehead, LW Sunderland, Bowden, Reserves McGuigan, Shorrocks, Schofield, Thomas.

== Second round ==
The Paterson Thistles protest was sustained in their match with the Longfellows and ordered replayed.

December 19, 1891	Paterson Thistle	2–4	Longfellows	Paterson, NJ
3:00 PM				Stadium: Recreation grounds Referee: Mr. Henshall (Paterson)
Note: Thistle: GK G.Cummings, FB T.Turner, D.Young, HB W.Ritchie, R.Stevenson, R.Richmond, FW McCanle, A.Findley, T.Cairns, J.Turner, W.Turner.

January 9, 1892	True Blues	5–3	O.N.T.	Haledon, NJ
				Stadium: Paterson Recreation Company; Attendance: 200
Note: O.N.T.: GK P.Hughes, FB H.Holden, G.Walker, HB J.Hood, J.William, J.Shelby, FW R.Stewart, Hood, Hughes, Haworth, Rook. True Blues: GK S.Templeton, FB Ross, W.Pearson, HB J.Hall, H.Finley, A.Ackerman, FW W.Nield, S.Saunders, T.Nield, W.Vernon, W.McDonald, A.Bray.

January 23, 1892	Caledonians	4–8	NY Thistles	Newark, NJ
	Bennett; Barr; Morgan		Adams 3'; Flynn	Stadium: Kearny Athletic grounds Referee: Mr. Ritchie (Paterson)
Note: Caledonian: GK Patrick Flynn, FB John Brown, Thomas Kirk, HB Frank McDonald, A.Burno, F.Britchford, FW William Bennett(c), John Singleton, C William Barr, LW John Swithemby, Edward Morgan, Reserves John Sankey, Ernest James, Walter Taylor, W.Shaw. Thistle: G Cameron, FB Patrick, Ritchie, HB Flynn, Entwistle, Hines, FW Jameson, Scott, Adams, Fraser, Purvis.

January 2, 1892	Rovers	2–4	East Ends	Fall River, MA
3:00 PM	Farrell 6'; Henry 11'		Tobin 87'	Stadium: Rovers' grounds Attendance: 2000; Referee: Mr. James Hood (Newark)
Note: Rovers: GK Simester, FB Adams, King, HB William Barlow, Puleston, Culligan, RW Farrell, Gavin, C M.Harrington, LW Kenny, J.Harrington. East Ends: GK Irving, FB Morris, Hargraves, HB Scott, Philbin, Stanton, RW Whitehead, Tobin, C Boyd, LW Sunderland, Bowden, Reserves McGuiggan, Sharrocks.

January 30, 1892	Barre Rangers	w/o	Conanicuts	Barre, VT

=== replay ===
March 12, 1892	Paterson Thistle	1–2	Longfellows	Haledon, NJ
				Stadium: Paterson Recreation grounds

== Third Round ==
Thistles drew a bye.

March 26, 1892	Conanicuts	1–4	East Ends	Fall River, MA
3:30 PM	Whittaker 55'		Sunderland 33' (1H); Borden; 80'	Stadium: Rovers' grounds Attendance: 6000; Referee: Hood (Newark)
Note: Conanicuts: GK Dennis Shay, FB Buckley, Cusick, HB Whittaker, Cutler, Lagrosse, RW Bell, Bannister, C Gillette, LW Griffin, Leveque. East Ends: GK Irving, FB Boyd, Gregory, HB Scott, Philbin, Hughes, RW P.Stanton, Tobin, C Jeffrey, LW Sunderland, Bowden.

April 2, 1892	True Blues	2–3	Longfellows	Haledon, NJ
3:00 PM			80'	Stadium: Paterson Recreation grounds

== Semifinal ==
April 1892	Thistles	–	Longfellows

== Final ==
May 14, 1892	NY Thistles	2–5	East Ends	Kearny, NJ
3:00 PM	Fraser; 65'		Tobin; Jeffrey, 35'; Bowden; Sunderland	Stadium: Athletic grounds Attendance: 1000; Referee: Robert C. Miller (AFA Pres.)
Note: East Ends: GK Irving, FB Morris, Gregory, HB Scott, Hughes, Philbin, RW Jeffrey, Tobin, C Boyd, LW Sunderland, Bowden. Thistle: G Cameron, FB Patrick, Ritchie, HB Wiley, Entwistle, Duncan, RW Jameson, Scott, C Flynn, LW Fraser, McKinley.

== American Cup bracket ==
First Round
(New Jersey)	Caldonians	3
(New Jersey)	Trenton	1
(New York (state))	Thistles	2–2 (Note: Protest resulted in replay)–4
(New York (state))	Brooklyn	2–0–3
Eastern District
(New Jersey)	Paterson	2
(New Jersey)	Paterson True Blues	3
(New Jersey)	Clark O.N.T.	w/o
(New York (state))	Nonpareils
(New Jersey)	Paterson Thistle	8
(New York (state))	Comrades	1
(New York (state))	Longfellows	9
(New York (state))	Atlantics	0
(Vermont)	Barre Rangers
(Massachusetts)	Quincy
(Rhode Island)	Metropole A.A.	3–2 (Note: Ordered replayed due to darkness)–3 (Note: no replay conducted due to Metropole A.A. disbanding)
(Massachusetts)	Canonicuts	3–4–3
(Massachusetts)	Fall River Olympics	3–3
(Massachusetts)	Fall River Rovers	3–4
(Rhode Island)	Pawtucket Free Wanderers	0 (Note: Ordered to be replayed due to rough play)–0 (Note: Ordered to be replayed after disputed goal)–1
(Massachusetts)	Fall River East Ends	2–1–3
Western District

Second Round
(New Jersey)	Caledonian	4
(New York (state))	Thistles	8
(New Jersey)	Paterson True Blues	5
(New Jersey)	Clark ONT	3
(New Jersey)	Paterson Thistle	2 (Note: Thistle protested and replay was reordered)–1
(New York (state))	Longfellows	4–2
(Vermont)	Barre Rangers
(Massachusetts)	Canonicuts	w/o
(Massachusetts)	Fall River Rovers	2
(Massachusetts)	Fall River East Ends	4

Third Round
(New York (state))	Thistles
bye
(New Jersey)	Paterson True Blues	2
(New York (state))	Longfellows	3
(Massachusetts)	Conanicuts	1
(Massachusetts)	Fall River East Ends	4

Semifinals
(New York (state))	Thistles
(New York (state))	Longfellows
(Massachusetts)	Fall River East Ends
bye

Final
(New York (state))	Thistles	2
(Massachusetts)	Fall River East Ends	5

Notes;
