= 1890–91 American Cup =

Soccer tournament

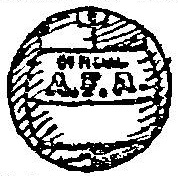

Tournament details
- Country: United States
- Teams: 15

Final positions
- Champions: Fall River East Ends (1st title)
- Runners-up: Longfellows

Tournament statistics
- Matches played: 14
- Goals scored: 109 (7.79 per match)

The 1890–91 American Cup was the seventh edition of the soccer tournament organized by the American Football Association. The Fall River East Ends won their first title, keeping the title in Fall River for the fourth year running. Fall River Olympic won the title in 1890 and Fall River Rovers won in 1888 and 1889. The Fall River Rovers were readmitted to the AFA after having settled their dispute with the Pawtucket Free Wanderers, before which any associations teams were barred from playing them.

== Participants ==
Joining this season were British Hosiery, Cumberland Rangers, Holyoke Rangers, Lowell Thistle, New Rochelle, and Nonpareils. Not returning from last season were Lonsdale, Paterson FC, Providence Athletic, and Trenton FC.

| State | City | Team |
|---|---|---|
| Massachusetts | Holyoke | Holyoke Rangers |
| Massachusetts | Lowell | Lowell Thistle |
| Massachusetts | Fall River | Fall River East Ends |
| Massachusetts | Fall River | Fall River Olympics |
| Massachusetts | Fall River | Fall River Rovers |
| New Jersey | Newark | Clark O.N.T. |
| New Jersey | Newark | Newark Caledonian |
| New Jersey | Kearny | Kearny Rangers |
| New York | Brooklyn | Longfellows |
| New York | Brooklyn | Nonpareils |
| New York | New Rochelle | New Rochelle FC |
| New York | New York | Thistle |
| Rhode Island | Cumberland | Cumberland Rangers |
| Rhode Island | Pawtucket | Pawtucket Free Wanderers |
| Rhode Island | Thornton | British Hosiery |

== Round 1 ==
The drawing for round one took place on Saturday September 20. Caledonian drew a bye to Round 2. Matches to be played on or before October 18.

=== Eastern District ===
| October 12, 1890 | Fall River East Ends | 11-1 | Cumberland Rangers | Fall River, Massachusetts |
| 3:45PM | Farrell (1H); Cornell (1H); P.Stanton (1H); Tobin (1H); Sunderland (1H); Scofield (2H) | | Bennett (2H) | Stadium: County Street grounds Attendance: 800; Referee: William Bell (Olympics) |

| October 18, 1890 | Fall River Rovers | 10-1 | British Hosiery | Fall River, Massachusetts |
| 4:00PM | Thomas Kenney 5' (1H); Robert Bell 9', 13'; Patrick Gavin (1H); George Adams (1H) (2H) (2H) (2H) | | Guy 60' | Stadium: Rovers’ grounds Attendance: 1000; Referee: William Taylor |
Note: One source gave the final score as 7–0. Another gave the half-time score as 7-0 and the final as 10–1.

| October 18, 1890 | Holyoke Rangers | 6-2 | Lowell Thistle | Holyoke, Massachusetts |
| 3:00PM | 10'; McDonald,, Matthew | | (1H) (2H) |

| October 18, 1890 | Pawtucket Free Wanderers | 3-1 | Fall River Olympic | Pawtucket, Rhode Island |
| 3:30PM | Mullarkey (1H); Dalton 42'; Slater 87' | | Randall 50' | Attendance: 3000; Referee: E.Walker (Kearny Rovers) |
Note: A protest was entered by Fall River Olympic over an unregistered player (John Stuart). The match was ordered to be played again on the Pawtucket grounds by November 15.

=== Western District ===
| October 18, 1890 | Kearney Rovers | w/o | New York Thistle | Kearney, New Jersey |
| | | | | Stadium: Cosmopolitan Park; Attendance: 300 |
Note: Thistles failed to show up. Match was given to Kearney Rovers.

| October 18, 1890 | Longfellows | 13-0 | New Rochelle FC | Ridgewood, Queens, New York |
| | J. McConnell, J. Green,, W. Paul,, J. Connoly, J. Lennon; J. McCalligan; R. Mave | | | Stadium: Ridgewood Grounds; Referee: T. Osborn (Caledonian) |
Note: Two sources gave a final score of 13–0. Two others gave a final score of 14–0.

| October 18, 1890 | Nonpareils | w/o | ONT |
Note: ONT withdrew.

=== Replay ===
| November 15, 1890 | Pawtucket Free Wanderers | 3-1 | Fall River Olympic | Pawtucket, Rhode Island |
| 3:00PM | Barr 30', 63'; Slater (2H) | | (1H) | Attendance: 3000; Referee: T. Hood (AFA secretary) |

== Round 2 ==
The drawing for round two took place on Saturday October 25, matches to be played within the next six weeks.

=== Eastern District ===
| November 29, 1890 | Fall River Rovers | 6-1 | Holyoke Rangers | Fall River, Massachusetts |
| 3:30PM | 12'; Colligan 27'; George Adams 60'; Bell (2H); Kenney 80' | | Fisher 40' | Stadium: Rovers’ grounds Attendance: 1500; Referee: Hood (Newark, NJ) |

| December 6, 1890 | Fall River East Ends | 6-2 | Pawtucket Free Wanderers | Fall River, Massachusetts |
| 3:00PM | 23'; Schofield 38'; Sunderland 41', 58'; Farrell 87' | | Stewart 20' (o.g.); Jeffreys 33', 43' | Stadium: County Street grounds Attendance: 2500-3000; Referee: E. Walker(Kearney Rovers) |
Note: Match was protested by East Ends, but the protest was dismissed.

=== Western District ===
| December 6, 1890 | Longfellows | 8-0 | Caledonian | Ridgewood, Queens, New York |
| 15:00 | J. McConnell,,, O. Connell, C. McGovern; W. Paul | | | Stadium: Ridgewood Grounds |

| November 29, 1890 | Nonpareils | 5-5 | Kearney Rovers | Brooklyn, NY |
| | North, (1H) (1H); Young (2H) | | Hood 10' (2H) (2H) (2H) (2H) | Stadium: Ridgewood Baseball grounds |
Note: AFA decided in favor of Nonpareils after failure to arrange dates with Kearny Rovers.

== Round 3 ==
Round 3 matches were arranged at a meeting on Saturday December 20. Nonpareil to play Longfellows and Fall River East Ends to play Fall River Rovers, on or before the First Saturday in March.

=== Eastern District ===
| February 28, 1891 | Fall River East Ends | 4-3 | Fall River Rovers | Fall River, Massachusetts |
| 3:30PM | Sunderland, 75'; 35'; Stanton 42' | | Kenney; Bell 55' (2H) | Stadium: County Street grounds Attendance: 5,000; Referee: Abraham L. Pilling |
Note: Fall River Rovers entered a protest. A meeting was held on Saturday March 14 to consider the protest but a quorum was not present.

=== Western District ===
| March 15, 1891 | Nonpareil | 5-5 | Longfellows | Newark, New Jersey |
| | | | | Stadium: Kearney Athletic Grounds; Attendance: 2,000 |

=== Replay ===
| April 4, 1891 | Longfellows | 2-1 | Nonpareils | Ridgewood, Queens, New York |
| 15:00 | | | | Stadium: Ridgewood Grounds |

== Final ==
| April 25, 1891 | Fall River East Ends | 3-1 | Longfellows | Pawtucket, Rhode Island |
| | Tobin; Sunderland, | | Neave 11' | Stadium: Dexter Street Grounds; Attendance: 2500; Referee: Turner (AFA president) |

== American Cup bracket ==
First Round | Second Round
(Massachusetts) | Fall River East Ends | 11
(Rhode Island) | Cumberland Rangers | 1
(Massachusetts) | Fall River East Ends | 6
(Rhode Island) | Pawtucket Free Wanders | 2
(Rhode Island) | Pawtucket Free Wanderers | 3–3
(Massachusetts) | Fall River Olympic (Note: Fall River Olympic entered protest over unregistered player, replay was ordered) | 1–1
Eastern District
(Massachusetts) | Fall River Rovers | 10
(Rhode Island) | British Hosiery | 1
(Massachusetts) | Fall River Rovers | 6
(Massachusetts) | Holyoke Rangers | 1
(Massachusetts) | Holyoke Rangers | 6
(Massachusetts) | Lowell Thistle | 2
(New York (state)) | Nonpareils | w/o
(New Jersey) | Clark ONT (Note: Clark ONT withdrew)
(New York (state)) | Nonpareils (Note: AFA decided in favor of Nonpareils after Kearny Rangers failed to arrange dates) | 5
(New Jersey) | Kearny Rangers | 5
(New Jersey) | Kearny Rovers | w/o
(New York (state)) | New York Thistle (Note: Thistle failed to show up for game)
(New York (state)) | Longfellows | 13
(New York (state)) | New Rochelle FC | 0
(New York (state)) | Longfellows | 8
(New Jersey) | Caledonian | 0
(New Jersey) | Caledonian
bye

Semifinals
(Massachusetts) | Fall River East Ends | 4
(Massachusetts) | Fall River Rovers | 3
(New York (state)) | Nonpareils | 5–1
(New York (state)) | Longfellows | 5–2

Final
(Massachusetts) | Fall River East Ends | 3
(New York (state)) | Longfellows | 1

Notes;
