= 1898 American Cup =

Soccer tournament

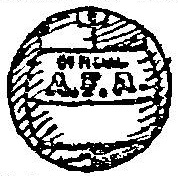

Tournament details
- Country: United States
- Teams: 2

Final positions
- Champions: Arlington A.A. (1st title)
- Runners-up: Kearny A.C.

Tournament statistics
- Matches played: 2
- Goals scored: 12 (6 per match)
- Top goal scorer: Gorman (3)

The 1898 American Cup was the fourteenth edition of the soccer tournament organized by the American Football Association. The Arlington Athletic Association won the series against the Kearny A.C. At the annual AFA meeting at Union Hall in East Newark on September 25, 1897, the committee elected was Dr. J.W. Reid of Arlington A.A. as president, William Robertson of Kearny as Secretary, and John McCance of Kearny Association as Treasurer.

== Entries ==
Among the clubs present at the annual meeting were the Paterson True Blues, Paterson Crescents, Scottish Americans, Kearny Athletics, New Rochelle Football Club and Arlington AA. Some of the teams preferred a league plan as opposed to a knockout system. The only teams that paid the entry fee were, Arlington, Kearny A.C. and New Rochelle. With the exception of New Rochelle, the other five teams took part in the NAFBL this season which took place from October 1897 to March 1898.

== Draw ==
The tournament schedule was released following the conclusion of the NAFBL season. The only eligible teams that paid their deposits in September were Arlington, Kearny and New Rochelle. The original format was as a double round robin series:

- March 26 New Rochelle vs. Arlington at New Rochelle
- April 2 Arlington vs. New Rochelle at Arlington
- April 9 Kearny Athletics vs. New Rochelle at Cosmopolitan Park
- April 16 Arlington vs. Kearny Athletics at Arlington
- April 23 Kearny Athletics vs. New Rochelle at New Rochelle
- April 30 Kearny Athletics vs. Arlington at Cosmopolitan Park

== Matches ==
The New Rochelle Club did not participate. Arlington and Kearny played a two-game series to decide the championship.

| April 9, 1898 | Arlington | 3–0 | Kearny | Arlington, NJ |
| | Gorman; Bruxby; Moore |

| April 23, 1898 | Kearny | 4–5 | Arlington | Cosmopolitan Park, Newark, NJ |
| | McGee 30', 75'; Richmond 31'; Montgomery 54' (pen.) | | J. Boyle 2'; Gorman 42', 76'; Bruxby 49'; Moore 88' | Referee: E. Sargent |
Note: Kearny: GK Hayes, FB Sanson, Donnelly, HB Sagis, Cutter, McCance, RW Montgomery, Richmond, C Mulvey, LW Singleton, McGee. Arlington: GK Moriarty, FB Eagan, Coburn, HB Slack, Camb, J. Boyle, RW Gorman, Fergerson, C Moore, LW Boyle, Bruxby.

== See also ==
- 1897-98 NAFBL
