= 1885–86 American Cup =

Soccer tournament

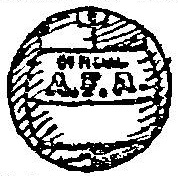

Tournament details
- Country: United States
- Date: October 24, 1885 – April 3, 1886
- Teams: 7

Final positions
- Champions: Clark O.N.T. (2nd title)
- Runners-up: Kearny Rangers

Tournament statistics
- Matches played: 8
- Goals scored: 36 (4.5 per match)

The 1885–86 American Cup was the second installment of the soccer tournament directed by the American Football Association. Clark O.N.T., as holders of the trophy, had successfully defended their title and receiving along with the trophy a pair of leg guards donated by the Alma Cricket and Football club.

== Participants ==
The clubs still all came from New York and New Jersey, though there were now four different cities represented. The Domestic club became the Almas, while New York Rovers and Trenton were added. The Alma football club, established in 1884, played out of Frelinghuysen Avenue Grounds and wore black jerseys and white knickerbockers. The Trenton football club, established in 1886, played out of the East State Street grounds and wore blue and black jerseys, blue caps, white shorts, and red socks.

State	City	Team
New Jersey	Paterson	Caledonian Thistle Club
New Jersey	Newark	Almas
New Jersey	Newark	Clark O.N.T.
New Jersey	Newark	Domestic
New Jersey	Kearny	Kearny Rangers
New Jersey	Trenton	Trenton F.B.C.
New York	New York	New York F.B.C.
New York	New York	New York Rovers

Participants

== Competition ==
=== First round ===
Caledonian Thistle drew a bye.

October 24, 1885	Trenton	0–4	Kearny Rangers	Trenton, New Jersey
3:30 PM				Stadium: Cricket Grounds; Referee: H.Starmer
Note: Trenton- E.H.Openshaw(c), J.James, J.Mart, H.Everingham, T.Baddely, D.Baggley, J.Mardel, W.Emery, T.McNichol, Frank Gee, R.Rhodes. Kearny Rangers: GK D.Ferguson, DF J.Hood, J.Lennox, MF T.Burke, W.Hood, D.Morris, FW R.Raeburn, W.Taylor, J.Young, J.Taylor, H.Ashley.

October 31, 1885	O.N.T.	10–0	New York Rovers	East Newark, New Jersey
				Stadium: ONT AA Grounds; Referee: T.Hood
Note: O.N.T.: GK R.Hughes, DF Harry Holden, J.Dougherty, MF T.Smith, Joe Swithemby, A.Polisher, FW C.McCann, James Howarth, Jack Swithemby, James McGurck, Joseph Swarbrick. Rovers: GK W.Donnegan, DF A.Crawford, W.Dunnan, J.Lachlan, MF W.Lachlan, B.Wilson, H.Westbrook, FW J.White, F.Malcomb, W.Harris, A.Campbell.

November 3, 1885	Alma	1–1	New York	Newark, New Jersey
2:45 PM	Maxfield		Grant 85'	Stadium: Frelinghuysen Grounds; Referee: T.Hood
Note: Almas: GK Hollenback FB Starmer, Moore, HB Frank Farrow, Morton, Corbey, FW Lucas, Lodge, Maxfield, John Gray, George Curtin.

==== First replay ====
November 14, 1885	Alma	1–1	New York	Hoboken, New Jersey
				Stadium: Elysian Fields

==== Second replay ====
November 26, 1885	Alma	4–2	New York	Newark, New Jersey
10:30 AM	Lodge, Gray,		Johnston; Lucas	Stadium: Frelinghuysen Grounds; Attendance: 600

=== Second round ===
December 12, 1885	Clark O.N.T.	5–0	Caledonian Thistles	East Newark
3:30 PM	Jack Swithenby 10'; Devine 15'; Jack Swithemby 35'; McCann; Swarbrick			Stadium: ONT Grounds; Attendance: 500; Referee: C.Smith
Note: ONT: GK Hughes, DF Pollister, Holden, MF Howarth, Joe Swithenby, P.Smith, FW Swarbrick, McGurck, McCann, Devine, Jack Swithenby(c). Thistles: T.Paterson, Chapman, Hall, Williamson, Forsythe, W.Turner(c), Anderson, A.Turner, Donaldson, H.Craig, J.Kane.

December 12, 1885	Almas	0–3	Kearny Rangers	Newark, NJ
3:00 PM			Young 10'; Young; William Taylor	Stadium: Frelinghuysen Avenue Ground; Referee: R.Craig
Note: Almas: GK Ryker, DF Moore, Conklin, MF Corby, Morton, Hirst, FW Gray, Lucas, Lodge, Curtin, Maxfield. Rangers: GK T.Hood, DF J.Hood, Lennox, MF Buck, W.Hood, Crawford, FW Ashley, William Taylor, Walter Taylor, Raeburn, J.Young.

=== Final round ===
April 3, 1886	Clark O.N.T.	3-1	Kearny Rangers	Newark, NJ
3:30 PM	M.Devine 15'; J.McCann 25'; Fisher 65'		McKell 68'	Stadium: Frelinghuysen Avenue ground Attendance: 1000; Referee: A. Turner (Paterson Thistle)

Clark O.N.T.	Kearny Rangers

GK	Patrick Hughes
FB	A. Palister
FB	Harry Holden
HB	James Howarth (c)
HB	Joe Swithemby
HB	T. Smith
LW	Joseph Swarbrick
LW	J. Fisher
C	James McGurck
RW	M. Devine
RW	J. McCann

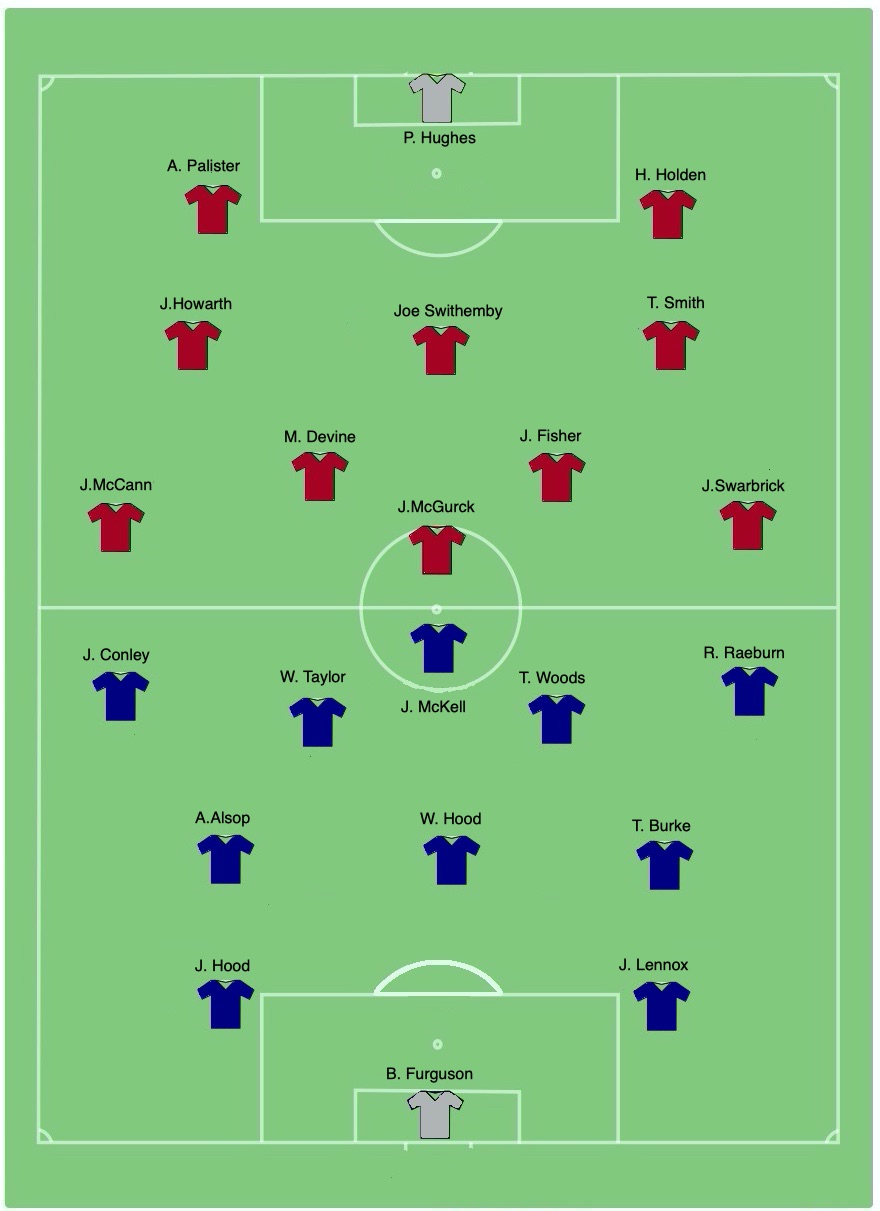

GK	B. Ferguson
FB	J. Hood
FB	J. Lennox (c)
HB	A. Alsop
HB	W. Hood
HB	T. Burke
LW	J. Conley
LW	W. Taylor
C	J. McKell
RW	R. Raeburn
RW	T. Woods

Umpires:
H. Starmer (Alma Club)
J. Johnston (New York)

Match rules

- 90 minutes
- Replay if game ends in a draw

== American Cup Bracket ==
Home teams listed on top of bracket

First Round
(New Jersey)	Clark O.N.T.	10
(New York (state))	New York Rovers	0
(New Jersey)	Caledonian Thistle
bye
(New Jersey)	Almas	4*
(New York (state))	New York	2
(New Jersey)	Trenton	0
(New Jersey)	Kearny Rangers	4

Second Round
(New Jersey)	Clark O.N.T.	5
(New Jersey)	Caledonian Thistle	0
(New Jersey)	Almas	0
(New Jersey)	Kearny Rangers	3

Finals
(New Jersey)	Clark O.N.T.	3
(New Jersey)	Kearny Rangers	1

Notes: * result after two replays

== Champions ==
American Football Association
Challenge Cup
Second Title

== Sources ==
- National Police Gazette
- New York Herald
- The New York Sun
- Spirit of the Times
- Morning Register
- Daily Advertiser
- Evening News
- Sunday Call
