= 1887–88 American Cup =

Soccer tournament

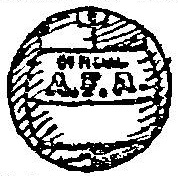

Tournament details
- Country: United States
- Dates: October 22, 1887 – April 14, 1888
- Teams: 15

Final positions
- Champions: Fall River Rovers (1st title)
- Runners-up: Newark Almas

Tournament statistics
- Matches played: 15
- Goals scored: 58 (3.87 per match)

The 1887–88 American Cup was the fourth edition of the soccer tournament organized by the American Football Association. Having expanded into the New England district the first new champions came from Fall River, Massachusetts after Clark O.N.T. of Newark had won the previous three editions. The Fall River Rovers defeated the Newark Almas in the final.

== Participants ==
Previously only the New York and New Jersey districts were represented. With the addition of the New England district, the tournament now included five new teams from three different states. Ansonia cricket and football club, organized in 1885, played out of Derby Driving Park wore navy blue jerseys and white knickerbockers. The East End football club, organized in 1882, played out of the County Street grounds and wore navy shirts and white shorts. The Fall River Rovers, organized in 1884, playing at Oak Grove Avenue wore gold jerseys, blue knickerbockers and red socks. The Pawtucket Free Wanderers were organized in 1885 and wore navy jerseys with white knickerbockers. Newark Caledonian football club was organized in 1885 and wore royal blue jerseys with white knickerbockers. The Providence cricket and football club, organized in 1886, wore light and dark blue jerseys, white knickerbockers and blue socks. The fifteen entrants were as follows:

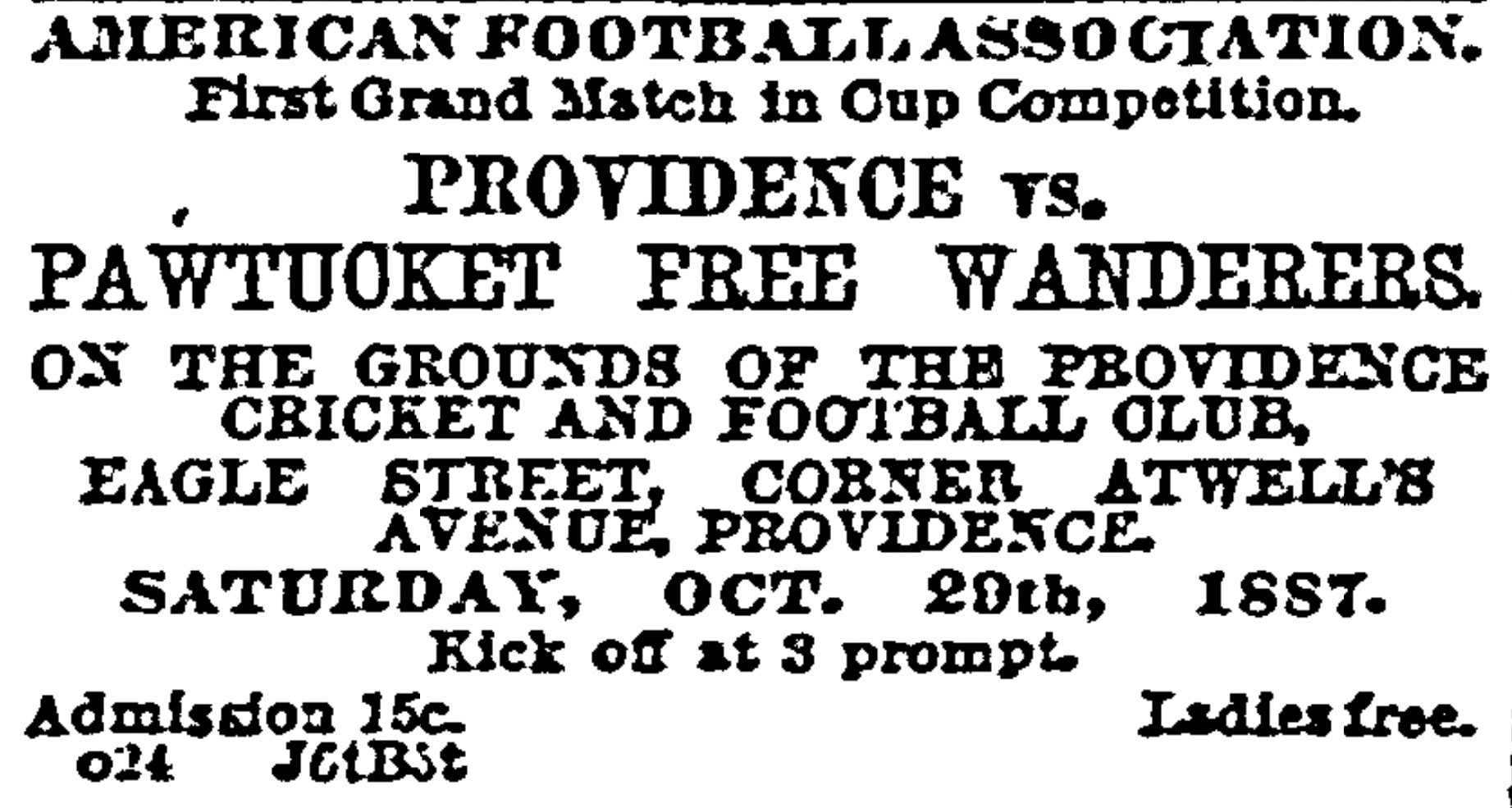
Ad for Providence vs. Pawtucket match

State	City	Team
Connecticut	Ansonia	Ansonia
Massachusetts	Fall River	Fall River Rovers
Massachusetts	Fall River	Fall River East Ends
New Jersey	Paterson	Paterson F.B.C.
New Jersey	Newark	Almas
New Jersey	Newark	Clark O.N.T.
New Jersey	Newark	Newark Caledonian
New Jersey	Newark	Tiffany Rovers
New Jersey	Kearny	Kearny Rangers
New Jersey	Trenton	Trenton F.B.C.
New York	New York	New York F.B.C.
New York	New York	Riverside
New York	New York	Thistle
Rhode Island	Pawtucket	Pawtucket Free Wanderers
Rhode Island	Providence	Providence Athletics

== First round ==
The draw was held on September 17, 1887. In order to reduce travel the teams were drawn in two sections with the Rhode Island and Massachusetts teams in the first section and the remaining teams in the second section. Riversides drew a bye. The second round was drawn on October 29, 1887.

October 22, 1887	Tiffany Rovers	0–4	Paterson	Newark, New Jersey
3:45 PM			60'; Wyatt; 80'; W.Bissland	Stadium: Wright Street grounds Referee: J.Howarth
Note: Rovers: GK J.Clancy, DF T.Crann, W.Flanning, MF M.O'Hara, J.Selby, D.Dwyer, FW C.Gray, A.Hinckley, W.Hinckley, J.Morton, M.Down. Paterson: GK W.Doney, DF J.Smallwood, B.Henshall, MF J.Henshall, G.Henshall, FW T.Bisland, T.Evans, H.Curry, W.Warburton, W.Wyatt, J.Sutton

October 22, 1887	Kearny Rangers	–	New York

October 24, 1887	Trenton	2–3	O.N.T.	Trenton, NJ
	Openshaw; 60'		60'; Connelly 70'	Stadium: East State grounds Attendance: 300; Referee: Spencer (Kearny Rangers)
Note: Trenton: GK Mart, FB Allman, Rhodes, HB James, Baddely, McNichol, FW Openshaw(c), Cooper, Byatt, Bagley, Ward. O.N.T.: GK Hughes, FB Holden, Pollister, HB Howarth, Joseph Swithemby, Dockery, FW John Swithemby(c), Swarbrick, Fisher, Connolly, McGurck.

October 29, 1887	Alma	5–1	Caledonian	New Jersey
3:40 PM	Gray 8'; Gray 23'; Cornall 50', Brennan		Hearn	Stadium: Wright Street grounds Newark; Referee: T.Smith (O.N.T.)
Note: Alma: GK Frank Farrow, DF George Wright, F.McDonald, MF E.Morton, F.Britchford, R.Pattison, FW Joseph Lucas, F.Cornall, Thomas Bright, John Gray, P.Brennan. Caledonian: GK H.Eddis, DF W.McCormick, John Hood, MF J.Lindsay, John Hearne, W.McNeil, FW J.McWilliams, J.Low, S.Hood, R.Barr, James Hearne.

October 29, 1887	Fall River Rovers	3–1	East Ends	Fall River, MA
	60'; 120', 120'		60'	Stadium: County Street grounds Attendance: 1300
Note: Rovers: G Long, FB Lonsdale, Bradley, HB Thomas, Waring, Adams, RW Bed, Blakely, LW Wild, Duff, C Buckley. East Ends: G Bracknell, FB Whittle, Karzenski, HB Coupe, Shoarocks, Lord, RW Wild, Whittle, LW King, Darlington, C Foley.

October 29, 1887	Providence	1–4	Pawtucket	Olneyville, RI
3:15 PM	Tomlinson 19'		J.Stewart; Lennox; H.Stewart; Hardy	Stadium: Eagle street grounds Referee: Thomas Bell
Note: Providence: GK Crone, DF Jack North, Osborne, MF Jerome, Morgan, Tomlinson, FW Such, Start, Axon, Ambler, Heliborne. Pawtucket: GK Bosch, DF Smith, Reye, MF Conley, Pilling, Jack McGuire, FW Hardy, Harry Stewart, John Stewart, Sunderland, Lennox.

October 29, 1887	Thistles	T–T	Ansonia	Metropolitan Park
Note: Article does not state score of drawn game.

=== replays ===
November 12, 1887	Ansonia	1–0	Thistle	Driving Park

== Second round ==
Clark ONT had experienced their first cup-tie loss at the hands of the Almas. ONT lodged a protest on two counts. The first goal obtained by the Almas was awarded by the referee when a shot at goal was struck by Holden with his arm. ONT alleged that the foul was not properly done. The second issue concerned a goal by ONT that was disallowed since it was from a free kick. ONT claimed that the ball was touched by Jack Swithemby before Howarth scored. At a meeting the following week, the AFA did not sustain the referee's decisions and called for a replay.

December 3, 1887	Alma	2–1	O.N.T.	Frelinghuysen avenue grounds
	55'; Lucas 75'		15'	Attendance: 200; Referee: J.Grant
Note: Alma: GK Frank Farrow, DF F.McDonald, B.Fagan, MF E.Morton, F.Britchford, George Wright, FW F.Cornall, Joseph Lucas, Thomas Bright, A.Mountford, John Gray. O.N.T.: GK Patrick Hughes, DF Harry Holden, A.Pallister, MF James Howarth, Joe Swithemby, P.Flynn, FW Joseph Swarbrick, J.Connolly, Jack Swithemby, James McGurck, Harry Fisher.

December 3, 1887	Fall River Rovers	3–0	Pawtucket Free Wanderers	Fall River, MA
	Brookshaw; Bell			Stadium: Rover grounds Attendance: 1000; Referee: Mr. Spencer (Newark)
Note: Rovers: GK Lang, DF Lonsdale, Bradley, MF Waring, Buckley, Adams, FW Bell, Brookshaw, Wilde, Duff, Blakely. Pawtucket: GK Booth, DF Smith, J.Stewart, MF Pilling, Love, Conley, FW Harding, H.Stewart, Sandilands, McGuire, Lennox.

December 10, 1887	Kearny Rangers	6–1	Ansonia	ONT grounds
	Walter Taylor 10'; W.Turner 20'; Campbell; Sergeant, Campbell		Wherle 60'	Attendance: 150; Referee: J.Howarth
Note: Rangers: GK J.Smith, DF E.Walker, William Lines, MF Roderick McDonald, T.Spencer, William Allsopp, FW Walter Taylor, George Sargeant, J.Campbell, W.Turner, E.Stark. Ansonia: GK W.Winfield, DF C.Williams(c), J.Williams, MF E.Wood, J.Lewis, J.Davidson, FW C.Williams, G.Bell, C.Wood, A.Wherle, M.McHale.

December 18, 1887	Riverside	0–5	Paterson

=== replay ===
February 22, 1888	Alma	5–1	O.N.T.	Wright street grounds

== Semifinals ==
March 3, 1888	Fall River Rovers	6–1	Kearny Rangers	Fall River, MA
	Blakeley 3'; Bell; Duff 60'; Bruckshaw, 85'		Stark	Stadium: Bedford Street grounds Attendance: 2000; Referee: Eli Morton (Almas)
Note: Rovers: GK Mullen, DF Bradley, Lonsdale, MF Buckley, Waring, Adams, FW Bell, Bruckshaw, Blakeley, Wilde, Duff. Rangers: GK J.H.Smith, DF W.Lines, L.Walker, MF Roderick McDonald, H.Bennett, William Allsop, FW W.Taylor, George Sargent, T.Spencer, A.Campbell, E.Stark.

March 10, 1888	Almas	5–1	Paterson	Frelinghuysen Avenue grounds
				Referee: H.Holden
Note: Alma: GK H.Farron, DF E.Morton, F.McDonald, MF P.Fagin, F.Britchford, R.Patterson, FW P.Brennan, Joseph Lucas, Thomas Bright, H.Maxfield, John Gray.

== Final ==
April 14, 1888	Almas	1–5	Rovers	East Newark, NJ
3:00 PM	Gray 40'		Bell 3'; Bruckshaw; Blakely; Wilde; Duff	Stadium: O.N.T. grounds Attendance: 400; Referee: B. Craig (New York)

Alma	Rovers

GK	Frank Farrow
FB	F. McDonald
FB	W. Fagin
HB	E. Morton
HB	R. Patterson
HB	F. Britchford
LW	John Gray
LW	H. Maxfield
C	Thomas Bright
RW	P. Garron
RW	F. Cornall

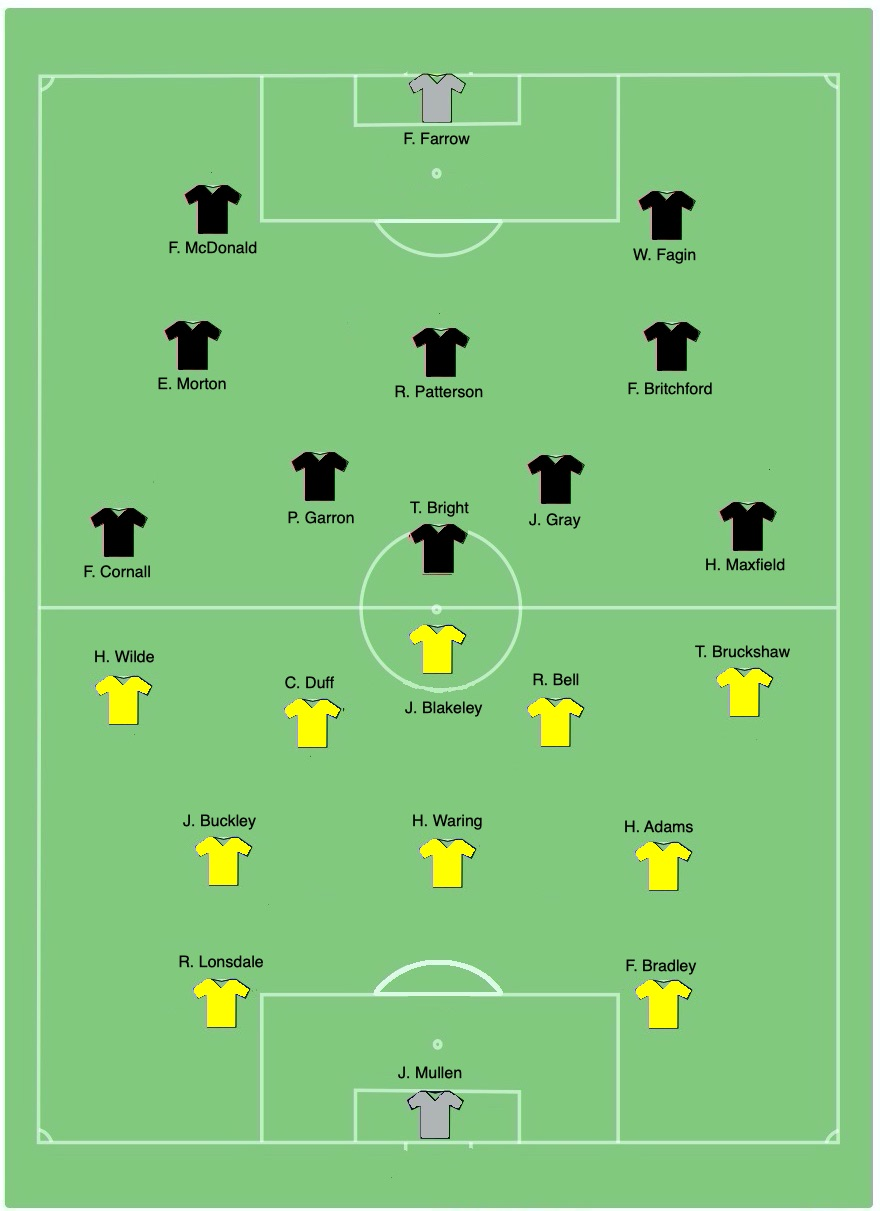

GK	J. Mullen
FB	R. Lonsdale
FB	F. Bradley
HB	J. Buckley
HB	H. Waring
HB	H. Adams
LW	H. Wilde
LW	C. Duff
C	J. Blakeley
RW	R. Bell
RW	T. Bruckshaw

Umpires:
P. O'Toole
William Allsop

Match rules

- 90 minutes
- Replay if game ends in a draw

== American Cup bracket ==
First Round
(New Jersey)	Almas	5
(New Jersey)	Caledonian	1
(New Jersey)	Trenton	2
(New Jersey)	Clark O.N.T.	3
(New York (state))	Riverside
bye
(New Jersey)	Tiffany Rovers	0
(New Jersey)	Paterson	4
(Massachusetts)	Rovers	3
(Massachusetts)	Fall River East Ends	1
(Rhode Island)	Athletics	1
(Rhode Island)	Free Wanderers	4
(New Jersey)	Kearny Rangers
(New York (state))	New York
(New York (state))	Thistles	0
(Connecticut)	Ansonia	1

Second Round
(New Jersey)	Almas	2–5
(New Jersey)	Clark O.N.T.	1–1
(New York (state))	Riverside	0
(New Jersey)	Paterson	5
(Massachusetts)	Rovers	3
(Rhode Island)	Free Wanderers	0
(New Jersey)	Kearny Rangers	6
(Connecticut)	Ansonia	1

Semifinal
(New Jersey)	Almas	5
(New Jersey)	Paterson	1
(Massachusetts)	Rovers	6
(New Jersey)	Kearny Rangers	1

Final
(New Jersey)	Almas	1
(Massachusetts)	Rovers	5

== Champions ==
American Football Association
Challenge Cup
Rover F.C.
First Title

== Sources ==
- Outing
- National Police Gazette
- New York Herald
- New York Times
- Spirit of the Times
- Trenton Times
- Fall River Herald
- Daily Advertiser
- Evening News
- Sunday Call
