= 1889–90 American Cup =

Soccer tournament

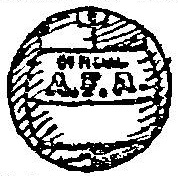

Tournament details
- Country: United States
- Teams: 14

Final positions
- Champions: Fall River Olympics (1st title)
- Runners-up: Kearny Rovers

Tournament statistics
- Matches played: 14
- Goals scored: 88 (6.29 per match)

The 1889–90 American Cup was the sixth edition of the soccer tournament organized by the American Football Association (AFA). The Fall River Olympics won their first title becoming the second Fall River team to do so after the Rovers had won the previous two editions.

== Participants ==
| State | City | Team |
|---|---|---|
| Massachusetts | Fall River | East Ends |
| Massachusetts | Fall River | Olympics |
| Massachusetts | Fall River | Rover F.C. |
| New Jersey | Paterson | Paterson F.B.C. |
| New Jersey | Paterson | Paterson Thistle |
| New Jersey | Newark | Clark O.N.T. |
| New Jersey | Newark | Caledonian Club |
| New Jersey | Kearny | Kearny Rangers |
| New Jersey | Trenton | Trenton F.B.C. |
| New York | Brooklyn | Longfellows |
| New York | New York | Thistle |
| Rhode Island | Lincoln | Lonsdale |
| Rhode Island | Pawtucket | Free Wanderers |
| Rhode Island | Providence | Providence Athletics |

== First round ==
The Fall River Rovers and Pawtucket Free Wanderers match was protested because of a dispute regarding gate receipts. The AFA ordered the game replayed. The Rovers disagreed with the decision and elected to withdraw from the Association. Pawtucket therefore was placed in the next round.

| October 5, 1889 | Providence Athletics | 3-1 | Lonsdale | Olneyville, RI |
| 3:30 PM | Fagen 60'; Morrison 120', | | 120' | Stadium: Eagle Street grounds Attendance: 600; Referee: Robert Finley(Pawtucket) |
Note: Providence: GK Robert Cook, FB M. Muirhead, McDonald, HB A. Cook, J. Dalton, G. Clegg, LW A. Hellborne, Thomas Morrison, RW J. Attewell, J. Mannion, C Barney Fagan. Lonsdale: GK Baine, FB McIntyre, McKay, HB Read, Patterson, Googhegan, LW Jenkins, Hector, RW O’Neil, Fields, C McClagat.

| October 5, 1889 | Fall River Olympics | 6–3 | Fall River East Ends | Fall River, MA |
| 3:45 PM | Clarkson 3'; Ingham 8'; 13'; Finlan 55'; 60'; Thomas Taylor | | Snape 12'; 120', | Stadium: County street grounds Attendance: 1000; Referee: Harry Mellor (Pawtucket) |
Note: Olympics: GK Harwood, FB Stewart, Lee, HB James Leigh, Burgess, Whittaker, RW Clarkson, Finlan, LW John Randall, Thomas Taylor, C Ingham. EastEnds: GK Marshall, FB Atley, Stanton, HB Sharrocks, Mercer, J. Foley, RW Tobin, P. Farnell, LW J. Taylor, Sunderland, C Snape.

| October 12, 1889 | Paterson Thistle | 3-5 | Kearny Rovers | Paterson, NJ |
| 3:00 PM | | | | Stadium: Olympic grounds |

| October 12, 1889 | Fall River Rovers | 4–1 | Pawtucket Free Wanderers | Fall River, MA |
| 3:30 PM | Cornell 3'; Bell, | | H.Stewart 39' (o.g.) | Attendance: 3400; Referee: Barr(Lonsdale) |
Note: Rovers: GK Shea, FB Bradley, Lonsdale, HB Adams, Waring(c), Buckley, RW Bell, Blakeley, LW Wilde, Duff, C Connell. Pawtucket: GK Hardy, FB Harry Stewart, Love, HB Smith, Devanney, Lennox, RW Sandiland, Jeffrey, LW Murray, Mularkey, C Graham.

| October 12, 1889 | Caledonian | 1-15 | Thistle | Kearny, NJ |
| | | | | Stadium: ONT grounds |

| October 12, 1889 | Brooklyn Longfellows | 3-2 | O.N.T. | Ridgewood baseball grounds |
| 3:30 PM | | | | Referee: A.Smedley |
Note: Longfellows: GK M. Gorvin, DF T. Fay, T. Masterton, MF T. Pope, T. Court, R. Neave, FW J. Green, J. McConnell, T. Brockington, C. Gorvin, J. Lennon. O.N.T.: GK T. Hughes, DF A. Lyon, W. Walker, MF J. Polisher, C. Alsopp, G. Williams, FW C. Bradley, A. Smith, T. Henderson, W. Downs, A. Singleton, L. D. Flynn.

| November 2, 1889 | Trenton | 2-0 | Paterson | Trenton, NJ |
| 3:30 PM | A. Cartiledge 44'; Joe James | | | Stadium: Hetzel’s Grove |

== Second round ==
| November 23, 1889 | Kearny Rovers | 4-3 | Brooklyn Longfellows | Kearny, NJ |
| | | | | Stadium: O.N.T. grounds Referee: Patrick Hughes (O.N.T.) |
Note: Rovers: GK J. Howarth, DF H. Holden, Jack Hood, MF T. Cranor, Joe Swithemby, W. Barr, FW John Swithemby, F. Costello, A. Cutler, James Hood, J. Connolly. Longfellows: GK W. Gordon, DF T. Fay, T. Masterson, MF T. Pope, D. Campbell, R. Reaves, FW T. Green, J. Taylor, W. Paul, C. Gorvin, J. Leonard.

| November 23, 1889 | Trenton | 2-2 | Thistles | Trenton, NJ |
| 4:00 PM | J.James; A.Cooper | | 60'; 120' | Stadium: Hetzel grounds Attendance: 400; Referee: A.Meadow |
Note: Trenton- G Harry Kelsall, FB G. Allman, R. Rhodes, HB W. Cooper, J. Irwin, T. Titley, RF A. Cooper, J. James, LF A. Cartidge, D. Baggeley, CF Elder; Thistle- G J. Cameron, FB W. Patrick, S. Russell, HB G. Kirk, T. Duncan, A. Toylie, RF A. Barnoor, J. Adams, LF E. T. Parvis, D. Barbeur, CF R. Robertson

| December 14, 1889 | Pawtucket Free Wanderes | 4–2 | Providence Athletics | Pawtucket, RI |
| | | | | Stadium: Dexter Street rounds Attendance: 600; Referee: Hood (Kearney) |
Note: Pawtucket: GK Shea, FB Harry Stuart, Love, HB Hardy, Devanney, Finn, RW Sandilands, Jeffrey, LW Murray, Monahan, C Graham. Providence: GK Bolan, FB Oborne, McDonald, HB M. Muirhead, J. Dalton, Guy, LW Fagin, J. Manionn, RW Booth, Guy, C A. Hellborne.

=== replays ===
| November 30, 1889 | Thistles | 2-3 | Trenton | Weehawken |
| 4:00 PM |
Note: Trenton- G Harry Kelsall, FB G. Allman, R. Rhodes, HB W. Cooper, A. Cooper, J. James, I. Irwin FW J. James, T. Titley, L. Byatt, D. Baggeley

== Semifinals ==
| January 18, 1890 | Pawtucket Free Wanderers | 0–4 | Fall River Olympics | Pawtucket, RI |
| 3:05 PM | | | Taylor 3'; Clarkson 33'; Slater 53'; Ingham 61' | Stadium: Dexter street grounds Attendance: 3000; Referee: Mr. Walker (New York) |
Note: Olympics: GK Cornell, FB Harwood(c), Jack Stuart, HB Simon Burgess, Abe Pilling, Whittaker, RW Jimmy Clarkson, Finlan, LW Taylor, Slater, C Ingham. Pawtucket: GK J. Shea, FB Love, Harry Stuart(c), HB Devanney, David Smith, Finn, RW Sandilands, Jeffrey, LW Murray, Mullarkey, C Graham.

| January 18, 1890 | Kearny Rovers | 5-1 | Trenton | Kearny, NJ |
| | Jack Swithemby; Connolly; Jimmy Hood; McNabb; Barr | | Carthege | Stadium: O.N.T. grounds Attendance: 600 |
Note: Kearny: GK Cutler, FB Holden, John Hood, HB Crans, Joe Swithemby, Howarth, FW McNabb, Jack Swithemby, Barr, Connelly, James Hood. Trenton: GK W. Bradshaw, FB Almon, Rhodes, HB James, Irwin, Cooper, FW Ward, J. Bradshaw, Heaton, Carthege, Byat.

== Final ==
| April 5, 1890 | Fall River Olympics | 4–3 | Kearny Rovers | Pawtucket, RI |
| 3:30 PM | Taylor 2'; Ingham 4'; Clarkson 11'; Pilling 23' | | 59'; Hood; 120' | Stadium: Dexter street grounds Attendance: 5000; Referee: William Turner (Paterson Thistles) |
Note: Olympics: GK William Connell, FB Richard Harwood, John Stuart, HB Simon Burgess, Abraham Pilling, James Whittaker, RW James Clarkson, John Finlan, LW Tommy Taylor, Thomas Slater, C Thomas Ingham. Rovers: GK Cutler, FB Holden, John Hood, HB Joe Swithemby, Howarth, Crann, RW Woods, John Swithemby, LW Connelly, James Hood, C Barr, Jameson.

== American Cup bracket ==
First Round
(Massachusetts) | Fall River Rovers | 4
(Rhode Island) | Free Wanderers (Note: Game was ordered replayed, Fall River Rovers did not show for replay, Free Wanderers awarded the win) | 1
(Rhode Island) | Athletics | 3
(Rhode Island) | Lonsdale | 1
(Massachusetts) | Olympics | 6
(Massachusetts) | East Ends | 3
(New Jersey) | Paterson Thistle | 3
(New Jersey) | Kearny Rovers | 5
(New York (state)) | Longfellows | 3
(New Jersey) | Clark O.N.T. | 2
(New Jersey) | Trenton | 2
(New Jersey) | Paterson | 0
(New Jersey) | Caledonian | 1
(New York (state)) | NY Thistle | 15

Second Round
(Rhode Island) | Free Wanderers | 4
(Rhode Island) | Athletics | 2
(Massachusetts) | Olympics
bye
(New Jersey) | Kearny Rovers | 4
(New York (state)) | Longfellows | 3
(New Jersey) | Trenton | 2-3
(New York (state)) | NY Thistle | 2-2

Semifinals
(Rhode Island) | Free Wanderers | 0
(Massachusetts) | Olympics | 4
(New Jersey) | Kearny Rovers | 5
(New Jersey) | Trenton | 1

Final
(Massachusetts) | Olympics | 4
(New Jersey) | Kearny Rovers | 3

Notes;

== Sources ==
- The Boston Globe
- New York Herald
- The New York Times
- The Providence Journal
- Trenton Times
- Sunday Call
