= Clark O.N.T. =

Soccer team in the U.S.

Clark ONT
- Full name: Clark ONT F.B.C.
- Founded: 1883
- Dissolved: ?
- Coach-Captain: Harry Holden
- League: AFA
colors

Clark Our New Thread, mostly known as Clark O.N.T. was a U.S. soccer team sponsored by the Clark Thread Company. The team competed in the annual American Cup, winning the first three championships. Beside Fall River Rovers, it is considered the most successful club in the late 1880s in American soccer.

== History ==
=== Name ===
Established November 15, 1883 at a meeting of 150 employees, the first president and vice-president elected were Campbell Clark and William Clark Jr. respectively. The Clark Thread Company originally named its soccer team "Clark Our New Thread" (Clark O.N.T.) as part of a marketing campaign introducing a new product.

As the product became established, the company renamed its athletic team to the simpler Clark A.A. While the Clark Thread Company factory was originally located in Newark, on the west bank of the Passaic River, the team played at Clark Field located on the east side of the river, an area known as East Newark.

=== Competition ===
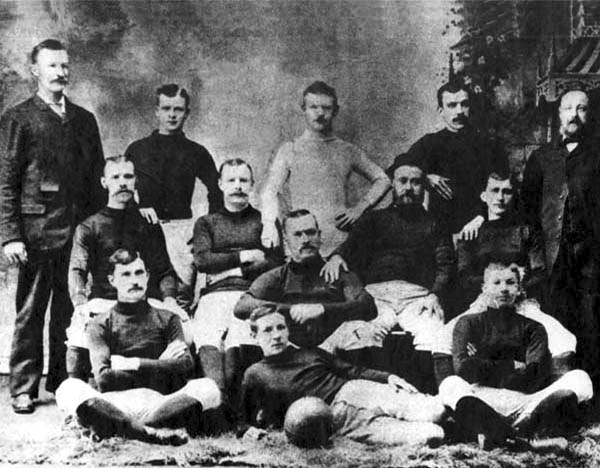
Clark ONT team of 1885

The team began play in February 1884 and later won the first American Cup which kicked off in late October of that year. After winning the first cup, Clark O.N.T. went on a 11-game tour of Canada, winning 9 games, losing 1 game, and drawing one game. It went on to win the next two American Cup championships, giving it the right to call itself the first U.S. soccer dynasty. Their second title followed a successful baseball campaign in which they won the Essex League championship. The cricket season was much less successful however, finishing with a record of 2 wins and 9 losses with 2 draws.

=== National team ===
Besides its league and cup records, Clark O.N.T. had a part in the first two, now unofficial, U.S. international games. The American Football Association sponsored two games with the Canada national team in 1885 and 1886. On November 28, 1885, Clark contributed both its field and five of its players to the game, won by Canada. The referee was also provided by O.N.T.

== Year-by-year ==
Year	League	Reg. season	American Cup
1884–85	?	?	Champion
1885–86	?	?	Champion
1886–87	?	?	Champion
1887–88	?	?	Second round
1888–89	?	?	Semifinal
1889–90	?	?	First round
1890–91	?	?	First round
1891–92	?	?	Second Round

== Honors ==
American Cup

- Winner (3): 1884–85, 1885–86, 1886–87
