= American Football Association (1884–1924) =

Defunct sports governing body

United States
- Short name: AFA
- Founded: 1894
- Folded: 1925; 101 years ago
- Location: Newark, New Jersey
- FIFA affiliation: No
- President: James Grant
- Vice-President: Thomas B. Hood

The American Football Association (AFA) was the first attempt in the United States to form an organizing soccer body.

== History ==
The Association was formed in 1884 at a meeting at Clark Thread Company in East Newark, New Jersey.

Initial officers
Position	Name
President	James Grant
Vice-President	Thomas B. Hood
Treasurer	Robert L. Craig
Secretaries	John Weston; Peter J. O'Toole

=== Standardization of rules ===
The purpose of the AFA included an attempt to standardize rules and procedures. It is unclear which set of rules was officially used by the AFA. At the time it was reported that the new organization had adopted English rules. though they may have been the 1881 version. But in the 1885–86 Scottish Football Association Annual the AFA's secretary, P.J. O'Toole, claimed the Scottish Rules were the basis for the American game. In addition, an 1887 review of the AFA's Constitution, By-Laws and Laws of the Game, showed how the AFA rules aligned more with the SFA's rules, rather than the English rules.

=== Cup competition ===
In addition to rule standardization, the AFA established America's first annual non-league cup for soccer. The competition was known as the American Football Association Challenge Cup, which was shorted to the American Cup. The initial edition took place in 1885 and was contested between six teams from New Jersey and New York. Within a couple of years it had expanded to include teams from four different states in New England. The American Cup was held for 14 years before having to be cancelled due to economic hard times in New England. After not being held for six years, the American Cup was reorganized through the commitment of eight teams, with thirteen teams eventually taking part in the reborn competition. The competition ran for another sixteen years, prior to not being held in 1922. The ruling by the USFA to only allow State Cup competitions in addition to the National Challenge Cup, resulted in teams from states outside New Jersey withdrawing from the competition. The competition was revived in 1923, but only lasted through the 1924 edition.

=== Professional encroachment ===
In 1894, the American League of Professional Football formed by multiple National League Baseball owners in an attempt to fill their stadiums during the winter. It was the first attempt to form a fully professional league. Though it only lasted for 17 days, the AFA still barred any players who had signed contracts with the new league from playing in AFA-sanctioned events.

=== Initial struggles ===
The AFA suffered from their initial problems in 1899, after the Panic of 1893, which had a negative effect on the Northeast's economy and when the textile workers went on strike, in addition professional players started becoming part of the New York and New Jersey teams, resulting in the cancellation of the American Cup from 1899 to 1905. Arlington A.A. maintained the cup during that time period.

=== Resurgence ===
The tour of both Corinthian F.C. and The Pilgrims F.C. in 1906 brought interest in soccer back to the region and the AFA reformed under the encouragement of Hal Holden. A new group of officers were reelected and the American Cup was reborn.

Reformed officers
Position	Name
President	Hal Holden
Vice-President	Peter Martin
Financial secretary	James Allen, Jr.
Corresponding secretary	Herbert Turner
Treasurer	Harry Craig

=== Association with the FA ===
AFA was allied with The Football Association, becoming a member on February 22, 1909, at an FA meeting chaired by Charles Clegg, and drew on that organization's approach to the game. As part of its efforts, the AFA directly organized cup competitions as well as overseeing the operations of member leagues.

The weakness of the AFA lay in its refusal to expand outside the southern New England region. In addition, those involved in American soccer had concerns about the AFA concentrating on professional players and their strong ties to the FA. AFA had never had an American president and in 1911 when they banned AFA-affiliated teams from playing Corinthian F.C., who was split from the FA, it was too much for many and they looked to join the newly formed American Amateur Football Association (AAFA).

=== Struggle with AAFA ===
When a movement began to create a national governing body in 1911, the AFA found itself confronting the newly established AAFA, a body which quickly became national. The AFA argued that it should be recognized by FIFA. However, several member organizations defected from the AFA to the AAFA in 1912. The AAFA quickly moved to reform itself as the United States Football Association, receiving FIFA recognition in 1913. The AFA continued to run the American Cup through 1924, but by that time it had been superseded by the National Challenge Cup and National Amateur Cup.

== American Cup ==
The American Football Association Challenge Cup (also known as simply "American Cup") was the first major U.S. soccer competition open to teams beyond a single league, being first held in 1884. By the mid-1890s soccer in American was struggling due to New England going through difficult economic times. As a result, the AFA suspended the cup from 1899 until 1906.

In the 1910s, it gradually declined in importance with the establishment of the National Challenge Cup. The competition was last held in 1924.
