= 1912–13 in American soccer =

Soccer in the United States
- Season: 1912-13

The 1912–13 season was the 1st season of FIFA-sanctioned soccer in the United States.

== National team ==
=== Men's ===
No national team matches were played during the 1912–13 season.

== League standings ==
=== National Association Foot Ball League ===
Position	Team	Pts	Pld	W	L	T
1	West Hudson A.A.	28	18	13	3	2
2	Paterson True Blues	29	19	13	3	3
3	Paterson Wilberforce	27	19	2	4	3
4	Jersey A.C.	23	18	10	5	3
5	Kearny Scots	16	17	7	8	2
6	Newark Caledonians	15	18	6	9	3
7	Bronx United	14	17	7	10	0
8	Paterson Rangers	12	17	5	10	2
9	Newark F.C.	8	13	3	8	2
10	Brooklyn F.C.	4	16	2	14	0

=== St. Louis Soccer League ===
Place	Team	GP	W	L	T	GF	GA	Points
1	St. Leo's	10	7	2	1	19	10	15
2	Innisfails	11	6	3	2	15	10	13
3	Columbus Club	10	3	6	1	10	15	7
4	Business Men's A.C.	10	2	7	1	12	21	5

== Tournaments ==
=== American Amateur Football Association Cup ===
Round of 16
November 24 - Morris Park
Yonkers F.C.	6
Holy Cross F.C.	2
November 24 - Astoria
Anglo-Saxon F.C.	5
White Rose F.C.	1
November 24 - Marquette Oval
St. George F.C.	3
New York Celtic	2
November 24 - Columbia Oval
German F.C.	4
Sheffield A.F.C.	2
November 24 - Edison Field
Hollywood Inn F.C.	1
Brooklyn Celtic	0
November 24/December 8 - New York
Clan MacDuff	6 ^{a}
Fulton A.C.	4
November 24 - Marquette Oval
Clan MacDonald	4
Washington F.C.	0
November 24 - Brooklyn
Critchley F.C.	2
Cameron F.C.	1

Quarter-finals
January 5 - Nepera Park
Yonkers F.C.	10
Anglo-Saxon F.C.	2
January 5, 12 - McNulty Field
St. George F.C.	3-5
German F.C.	3-4
January 5 - Dunning Oval
Hollywood Inn F.C.	3
Clan MacDuff	1
January 5 - Marquette Oval
Clan MacDonald	2
Critchley F.C.	0

Semi-finals
March 9 - McNulty Field
Yonkers F.C.	4
St. George F.C.	0
March 23 - Edison Field
Hollywood Inn F.C.	3
Clan MacDonald	1

Final
April 12 - Lenox Oval
Yonkers F.C.	3
Hollywood Inn F.C.	0

a) aggregate after 3 games

== Honors and achievements ==
Men
Competition	Winner
AAFA Cup	Yonkers F.C.
American Cup	Paterson True Blues
NAFBL	West Hudson A.A.
St. Louis Soccer League	Yonkers F.C.
