= 1913–14 in American soccer =

Soccer in the United States
- Season: 1913-14

The 1913–14 season was the second season of FIFA-sanctioned soccer in the United States.

== Honors and achievements ==
Competition	Winner
NAFBL	Brooklyn F.C. (1)
St. Louis Soccer League	St. Leo's (6)*
National Challenge Cup	Brooklyn F.C. (1)
American Cup	Bethlehem F.C.

Notes = Number in parentheses is the times that club has won that honor. * indicates new record for competition

== National team ==
=== Men's ===
No men's national team matches were played during the 1913–14 season.

=== Women's ===
The first women's national team match was not played until 1987.

== League standings ==
=== NAFBL ===
The National Association Foot Ball League conducted its eleventh season of play. The Brooklyn Field Club accumulated the most points at the end of the season, thus winning the league title.

Place	Team	Pld.	W	L	T	Points
1	Brooklyn F.C. (C)	14	12	0	2	26
2	West Hudson A.A.	16	11	2	3	25
3	New York Clan MacDonald	16	9	5	2	20
4	Newark F.C.	15	5	5	5	15
5	Paterson Rangers	14	5	5	4	14
6	Jersey A.C.	10	3	2	5	11
7	Kearny Scots	11	3	5	3	9
8	Paterson True Blues	10	3	3	2	8
9	Newark Caledonians	13	1	9	3	5
10	Paterson Wilberforce	12	2	8	1	5
11	Bronx United	12	2	9	1	5
12	St. George F.C.	13	1	11	1	3

2 points for a win, 1 point for a tie, 0 points for a loss. Source: RSSSF

=== STLSL ===
The seventh season of the St. Louis Soccer League was held. St. Leo's won their sixth-consecutive title that year. The league was split into two divisions; the Federal Park and Robinson League.

Federal Park League

Place	Team	GP	W	L	T	GF	GA	Points
1	St. Leo's	13	11	0	2	32	1	24
2	Ben Millers	13	7	4	2	21	13	16
3	Columbia A.C.	13	4	8	1	11	35	9
4	Rock Church A.C.	13	1	11	1	9	27	3

Robison League

Place	Team	GP	W	L	T	GF	GA	Points
1	Columbus Club	20	14	6	0	40	24	28
2	Innisfails	20	9	6	5	36	27	23
3	St. Theresa's	20	6	10	4	20	35	16
4	Athletics	20	5	12	3	23	33	13

== Cup Competitions ==
=== National Challenge Cup ===
The National Challenge Cup, known today as the Lamar Hunt U.S. Open Cup, held its inaugural tournament during the 1913–14 season. Brooklyn Field Club of Brooklyn, New York won the title.

Semifinals
Brooklyn F.C.	2
New Bedford F.C.	1
Brooklyn Celtic	6
Niagara Falls Rangers	2

Final
Brooklyn F.C.	2
Brooklyn Celtic	1

=== American Cup ===
The American Cup, then known as the AFA Cup held its 23rd staging of the competition. Bethlehem F.C. won the competition.

Semifinals
Tacony	2
Philadelphia Hibernian	1
Jersey A.C.	3
Bethlehem F.C.	4

Final
Tacony	0
Bethlehem F.C.	1
