= 1912 American Amateur Football Association Cup =

American soccer competition

1912 AAFA Cup
Tournament details
- Country: United States
- Teams: 27

Final positions
- Champions: Brooklyn Celtic
- Runners-up: Newark F.C.

Tournament statistics
- Matches played: 28
- Goals scored: 107 (3.82 per match)

The American Amateur Football Association Cup was an American soccer competition open to amateur teams affiliated with the American Amateur Football Association (AAFA). It played only two years, 1912 and 1913 before being superseded by the National Challenge Cup, now known as the Lamar Hunt U.S. Open Cup.

== History ==
In an October 1911 meeting, the New York State Football Association created the American Amateur Football Association (AAFA) and tasked it with standardizing rules and procedures for U.S. soccer. In 1912, the AAFA initiated a national cup open to all amateur U.S. teams. Despite the national invitation, only twenty-seven teams from the New York area entered along with one from Maryland. The AAFA had headquarters at the Astor House in New York City. The officers of the association were Dr. G.R. Manning (president), William A. Campbell (vice-president), C.C. Pickford (treasurer), Thomas W. Cahill (secretary). Organizations affiliated with the AAFA included the New York and District Amateur League, Metropolitan and District Amateur League, Utah Association Foot Ball Union, Michigan State Soccer Foot Ball League, Pittsburgh Press Soccer League, Association Foot Ball League of St. Louis and The Tribune Soccer League.

== Entries ==
- Anglo-Saxon F.C. – Brooklyn (NYDL D2)
- Arcadia Thistle F.C. – New York (NYDL D1)
- Boys Club F.C. – New York (MDL D1)
- Bronx United F.C. – New York (NAFL)
- Brooklyn F.C. – Brooklyn (NAFL)
- Brooklyn Celtic F.C. – Brooklyn (NYDL D1)
- Cameron F.C. – New York (NYDL D1)
- Clan Gordon F.C. – Portchester (NYDL D2)
- Clan McDonald F.C. – Brooklyn (NYDL D1)
- Clan McDuff – New York (NYDL D1)
- Clan McKenzie F.C. – (NYDL D1)
- Columbia Oval – New York (NYDL D1)
- Critchley F.C. – Brooklyn (NYDL D1)
- Donegal Celtic F.C. – (NYDL D2)
- Eureka F.C. – New York (NYDL D2)
- German A.C. – New York (NYDL D2)
- Greenpoint Rovers F.C. – Brooklyn (NYDL D2)
- Hollywood Inn F.C. – Yonkers (NYDL D1)
- Mount Vernon F.C. – (NYDL D2)
- New York Celtic F.C. – New York (NYDL D2)
- Newark F.C. – Newark (NYDL D1)
- St. George A – New York (NYDL D2)
- St. George B – New York (MDL D1)
- Sheffield F.C. – Newark (NYDL D2)
- Sons of St. George – Baltimore
- Washington F.C. – Weehawken (NYDL D2)
- Yonkers F.C. – (NYDL D1)

NYDL- New York and District Amateur Association Foot Ball League
MDL- Metropolitan and District Amateur Foot Ball League
NAFL- National Association Foot Ball League

== First round ==
The Bronx United, Brooklyn FC, Clan McKenzie, German AC and Greenpoint teams drew byes. Boys Club, Donegal Celtic and Mount Vernon forfeited.

7 January 1912	St. George B	2-4	Sheffield	New York
	2 2H'		2 1H'; 2 2H'	Stadium: Macombs Dam Park; Referee: F. Rushton

7 January 1912	Anglo-Saxon	2-2	Yonkers	Brooklyn, NY
2:45	1H'; 2H'		Price 1H'; Duffis 89'	Stadium: Canarsie; Referee: A. Burchall

7 January 1912	Boys Club	w/o	St. George A	Elmhurst, Long Island
				Referee: W. Welsh

14 January 1912	Critchley	w/o	Donegal Celtic
				Referee: W. Erskine

14 January 1912	Mount Vernon	w/o	Washington
				Referee: F. Smith

14 January 1912	Clan McDonald	4-0	Lord Baltimore	Brooklyn, NY
	Harrower 61'; Harrower 66'; Peters 2H'; Thompson 2H'			Stadium: Edison Field; Attendance: 1500; Referee: W. Williams

14 January 1912	Columbia Oval	2-3	Hollywood Inn	Central Oval
				Referee: F. Davies

28 January 1912	Eureka	0-9	Brooklyn Celtic	McNulty Field
				Referee: J. Johnstone

11 February 1912	Cameron	1-1	Newark	New York
	C. Pickford 1H'		Aitken 2H'	Stadium: Chelsea Park; Referee: G. Caldicott

18 February 1912	Clan Gordon	1-1	Arcadia Thistle	Portchester
2:45				Referee: T. Cunningham

1912	NY Celtic	2-2	Clan McDuff	Jasper Oval
2:45				Referee: C. Creighton

=== replays ===
18 February 1912	Newark	3-1	Cameron	Newark, NJ
			S. Welsh	Stadium: Morris Park

18 February 1912	Yonkers	6-1	Anglo-Saxon	Taft Oval

25 February 1912	Arcadia Thistle	2-1	Clan Gordon	Blatt's Oval

1912	NY Celtic	3-0	Clan McDuff

== Bracket ==
Round of 16
February 25
Clan MacDonald	8
Clan McKenzie	0
February 25 - Loughlin Oval
Brooklyn Celtic	8
Greenpoint	0
Critchley F.C.	w/o
Brooklyn F.C.
February 25 - Parkview Oval
Sheffield A.F.C.	2
Washington F.C.	1
February 25 - Morris Park
Newark F.C.	4
St. George F.C.	2
New York Celtic	0
Bronx United	2
February 25/March 3 - Truman Oval
Yonkers F.C.	1-0
Hollywood Inn	1-1
March 3/10 - Marquette Oval
Arcadia Thistle	1-6
German F.C.	1-2

Quarter-finals
March 24/April 7 - Brooklyn
Clan MacDonald	1-1
Brooklyn Celtic	1-2
March 17 - Edison Field
Critchley F.C.	2
Sheffield A.F.C.	0
Newark F.C.	w/o
Bronx United
March 24 - Truman's Oval
Hollywood Inn	8
Arcadia Thistle	1

Semi-finals
April 14 - Brooklyn - Edison Field
Brooklyn Celtic	5
Critchley F.C.	0
April 21 - Newark - Morris Park
Newark F.C.	5
Hollywood Inn	2

Final
May 11 - Brooklyn
Brooklyn Celtic	3
Newark F.C.	0

== Final ==
11 May 1912
4:00PM

Brooklyn Celtic	3–0	Newark F.C.
Campion 15'; O'Halloran 65'; Campion 80'

Marquette Oval, Brooklyn, NY
Attendance: 3,500
Referee: C. Creighton

Brooklyn Celtic	Newark

GK	J. Gavin
FB	James Robertson
FB	Andrew Robertson
HB	D. Flanagan
HB	Frank O'Hare (c)
HB	R. Owens
LW	D. McPherson
LW	T. Campion
C	R. O'Halloran
RW	M. King
RW	L. McKenzie
Manager:
McCamphill

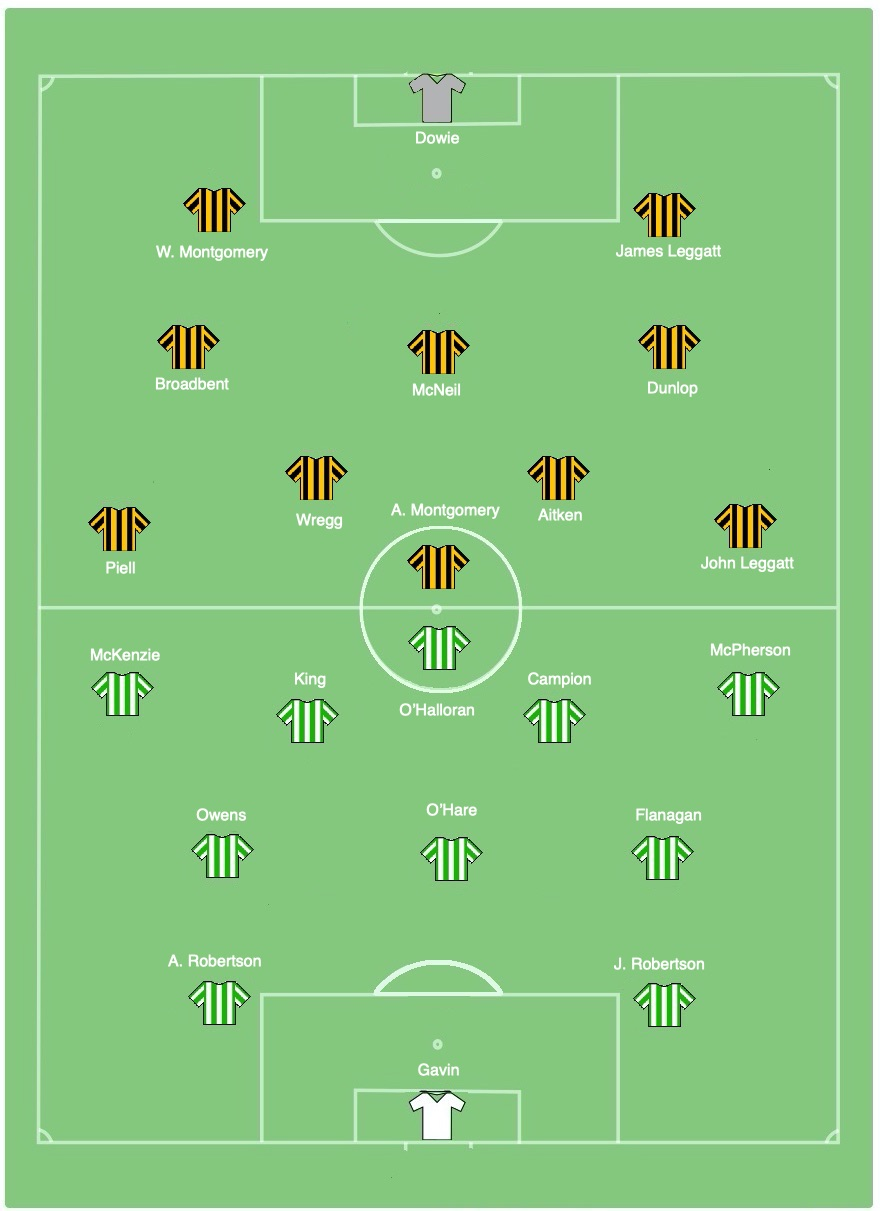

GK	Dowie
FB	W. Montgomery
FB	James Leggatt (c)
HB	Broadbent
HB	McNeil
HB	Dunlop
LW	Piell
LW	Wregg
C	A. Montgomery
RW	Aitken
RW	John Leggatt

Linesmen:
G. Caldicott
W. Williams

Match rules

- 90 minutes
- Replay if game ends in a draw

== See also ==
- 1911–12 American Cup
