= St. Louis Soccer Football League =

- Founded: 1907; 118 years ago
- Abolished: 1915; 110 years ago
- Region: St. Louis, Missouri
- Most championships: St. Leo's (4 titles)

The St. Louis Soccer Football League was a professional soccer league featuring teams from St. Louis, Missouri. The league ended in 1915 when the top two teams from league and the top two teams from the rival Federal Park Soccer League joined to form the new St. Louis Soccer League.

== History ==
The St. Louis soccer scene did not have a professional league during the 1906–07 season. The St. Louis Soccer Football League was organized to fill that void before the 1907–08 season. Dr. Alexander Murray was founding president and Thomas W. Cahill founding secretary of the league.

The city champions, St. Leo's, jumped from the defunct Association Football League of St. Louis to the St. Louis Soccer Football League prior to the 1908–09 season. St. Leo's continued their local dynasty winning four straight league titles along with defending their title as city champions.

In January 1913, in the middle of the 1912–13 season, St. Leo's withdrew from the St. Louis Soccer Football League. During the subsequent offseason, William J. Klosterman, manager of St. Leo's, claimed to have reorganized the St. Louis Soccer Football League with Winton E. Barker as its president. In actuality, this was a breakaway organization formed by Klosterman to compete with the already-established St. Louis Soccer Football League.

The new league had taken a lease to play its matches at the Athletic Park where the old league had played since its founding. As such, the old St. Louis Soccer Football League moved to Robison Field for the 1913–14 season. Confusion was caused by both leagues calling themselves by the exact same name and the new league moving into the old league's venue. As such, the old league was more commonly referred to as the Robison Field Soccer League while the new league was more commonly referred to as the Athletic Park Soccer League. The Athletic Park League affiliated with the newly sanctioned United States Football Association which left the older Robison Field League as an outlaw organization.

Prior to the 1914–15 season, the newer league moved into Federal League Park and renamed itself as the Federal Park Soccer League. Even after this name change, the older St. Louis Soccer Football League continued to be commonly called the Robison Field League.

Negotiations to end the warring between the leagues went on throughout the 1914–15 season until a plan was finalized near the end of March 1915. The plan called for the top two teams of the St. Louis Soccer Football league, Innisfails and Columbus Club, to be admitted to the U.S.F.A. and those teams to join the top two teams in the Federal Park League, St. Leo's and Ben Millers, to form a new, stronger organization, the St. Louis Soccer League.

== Past winners ==
St. Louis Soccer Football League winners
Season	Winner	Runner-up
1907–08	Innisfails	St. Matthew's
1908–09	St. Leo's	St. Teresa's
1909–10	St. Leo's	St. Teresa's
1910–11	St. Leo's	Columbus Club
1911–12	St. Leo's	Innisfails
1912–13	Innisfails	Business Men's A.C.
1913–14	Columbus Club	Innisfails
1914–15	Innisfails	Columbus Club

== Performances ==
St. Louis Soccer Football League winners by teams
Team	Winners	Runners-up	Years won	Years runner-up
St. Leo's	4	0	1908–09, 1909–10, 1910–11, 1911–12	
Innisfails	3	2	1907–08, 1912–13, 1914–15	1911–12, 1913–14
Columbus Club	1	2	1913–14	1910–11, 1914–15
St. Teresa's	0	2		1908–09, 1909–10
St. Matthew's	0	1		1907–08
Business Men's A.C.	0	1		1912–13

== Teams ==
- Athletics 1913–14
- Blue Bells 1907–08 through 1910–11

→ as Thistles 1907–08 through 1908–09

- Business Men's A.C. 1911–12 through 1912–13

→ as Irish American A.C. 1911–12

- Columbus Club 1910–11 through 1914–15 (Note: Becomes Missouri Naval Reserves upon moving to the St. Louis Soccer League for the 1915–16 season.)
- Compton Hill A.C. (Note: Team replaces St. Leo's in January 1913.) 1912–13
- Innisfails (Note: Team is sponsored by Innisfail but made up of players from Benld, Illinois.) 1907–08
- Innisfails (Note: This is a separate team sponsored by Innisfail (beginning with the 1909–10 season) from the one that competed during the 1907–08 season.) (Note: Team joins St. Louis Soccer League for the 1915–16 season.) 1908–09 through 1914–15

→ as West Ends 1908–09

- Manewals 1914–15
- St. Leo's 1908–09 through 1912–13 (Note: Team withdraws from league in January 1913 and is replaced by Compton Hill A.C.)
- St. Matthew's 1907–08
- St. Teresa 1907–80 through 1909–10
- Teresas (Note: This is a different team from the one that competed as St. Teresa's from 1907 through 1910.) 1913–14 through 1914–15

== See also ==
- Soccer in St. Louis
