= Federal Park Soccer League =

- Founded: 1913
- Abolished: 1915
- Region: St. Louis, Missouri
- Most championships: St. Leo's (2 titles)

The Federal Park League was a professional soccer league featuring teams from St. Louis, Missouri. The league ended in 1915 when the top two teams from league and the top two teams from the rival St. Louis Soccer Football League joined to form the new St. Louis Soccer League.

== History ==
In January 1913, in the middle of the 1912–13 season, St. Leo's withdrew from the St. Louis Soccer Football League. During the subsequent offseason, William J. Klosterman, manager of St. Leo's, claimed to have reorganized the St. Louis Soccer Football League with Winton E. Barker as its president. In actuality, this St. Louis Soccer Football League was a breakaway organization formed by Klosterman to compete with the already-established St. Louis Soccer Football League.

In addition to St. Leo's, a new Ben Millers team, managed by Pete Ratican (brother of Harry Ratican), and the Innisfails team joined the new league. While Michael Whelan, backer of the Innisfails decided to jump from the old St. Louis Soccer Football League to the new league and take over as manager of the team, Willie Foley, who had been manager of the Innisfails, and all the Innisfail players, stayed faithful to the old league. Given that his manager and all his players had decided to stay in the old league, Whelan returned to the old league as backer of the Innisfail team. The other two teams to join the new St. Louis Soccer Football League were Columbian A.C. and the Rock Church team, the latter invited as a member to replace the Innisfail team.

The new league had taken a lease to play its matches at the Athletic Park where the old league had played since its founding. As such, the old St. Louis Soccer Football League moved to Robison Field for the 1913–14 season. Confusion was caused by both leagues calling themselves by the exact same name and the new league moving into the old league's venue. As such, the old league was more commonly referred to as the Robison Field Soccer League while the new league was more commonly referred to as the Athletic Park Soccer League. The Athletic Park League affiliated with the newly sanctioned United States Football Association which left the older Robison Field League as an outlaw organization.

Prior to the 1914–15 season, the newer league moved into Federal League Park and renamed itself as the Federal Park Soccer League. Even after this name change, the older St. Louis Soccer Football League continued to be commonly called the Robison Field League. Compton Hill A.C. joined the Federal Park League to replace Rock Church.

Negotiations to end the warring between the leagues went on throughout the 1914–15 season until a plan was finalized near the end of March 1915. The plan called for the top two teams of the St. Louis Soccer Football league, Innisfail and Columbus Club, to be admitted to the U.S.F.A. and those teams to join the top two teams in the Federal Park League, St. Leo's and Ben Miller, to form a new, stronger organization, the St. Louis Soccer League.

== Past winners ==
Federal Park Soccer League winners
Season	Winner	Runner-up
1913–14	St. Leo's	Ben Millers
1914–15	St. Leo's	Ben Millers

== Performances ==
Federal Park Soccer League winners by teams
Team	Winners	Runners-up	Years won	Years runner-up
St. Leo's	2	0	1913–14, 1914–15	
Ben Millers	0	2		1913–14, 1914–15

== Teams ==
- Ben Millers 1913–14 through 1914–15
- Columbian A.C. 1913–14 through 1914–15
- Compton Hill A.C. 1914–15
- Rock Church 1913–14
- St. Leo's 1913–14 through 1914–15

== See also ==
- Soccer in St. Louis
