= Sam Fletcher (footballer) =

English footballer (1890–1972)

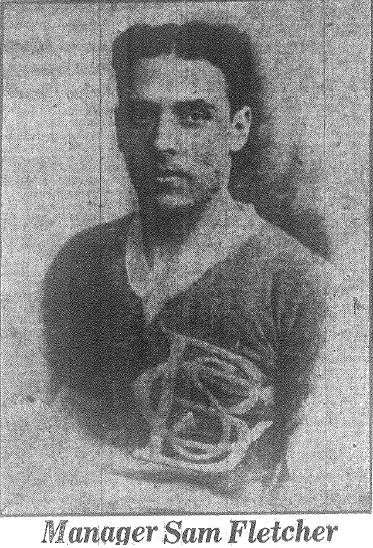

Personal information
- Full name: Samuel Fletcher
- Date of birth: 1890
- Place of birth: Manchester, England
- Date of death: 22 January 1972 (aged 81–82)
- Place of death: Cranston, Rhode Island, U.S.
- Position: Full back

Senior career*
Years	Team	Apps	(Gls)
1911	Independent Labour		
1912	Hamilton Lancashire		
–1914	Niagara Falls Rangers		
1914–1921	Bethlehem Steel		
1921–1923	Harrison S.C.	20	(1)
1923–1924	Newark Skeeters	23	(0)
1924–1928	Providence F.C.	45	(0)
1928–1929	→ Providence Gold Bugs	2	(0)

Managerial career
- 1924–1928: Providence F.C.
- 1925–1945: Brown University
- * Club domestic league appearances and goals

Sam Fletcher (1890 – 22 January 1972) was an English footballer who played as a full back in England, Canada and the United States. He later coached the Brown University soccer team.

== Player ==
Fletcher began his career in England, playing in the Manchester and District League. The League was experiencing difficulties which led to its suspending operations in 1912. Before that happened, Fletcher left England and emigrated to Canada in 1910. He settled in Hamilton, Ontario where he played for several teams including the Independent Labour Party Team and Hamilton Lancashire. At some point, he moved to the Niagara Falls Rangers which went to the semifinals of the 1914 National Challenge Cup. In October 1914, he signed with Bethlehem Steel, a powerhouse team playing in the Allied American Foot Ball League. He remained with Bethlehem for seven seasons. During those years, Fletcher and Jock Ferguson anchored the Steelmen defense, taking the team to six league titles, four National Challenge Cups and four American Cups. In 1921, Fletcher left Bethlehem with the establishment of the first American Soccer League. He signed with Harrison S.C. and spent two seasons with the team before moving to the Newark Skeeters for the 1923–24 season. In 1924, he became the player-coach of the expansion Providence F.C. In 1928, the team was renamed the Gold Bugs under new ownership. Fletcher played two games that season, then retired.

== Coach ==
In July 1924, Fletcher was hired to coach the newly established Providence F.C. He headed the team for at least four seasons. In 1925, he added duties coaching the Brown University soccer team to his professional responsibilities. He held that position until Joe Kennaway replaced him in 1946.

In addition to playing and coaching, Fletcher was also the ASL secretary in the early 1930s.
