= American Amateur Football Association Cup =

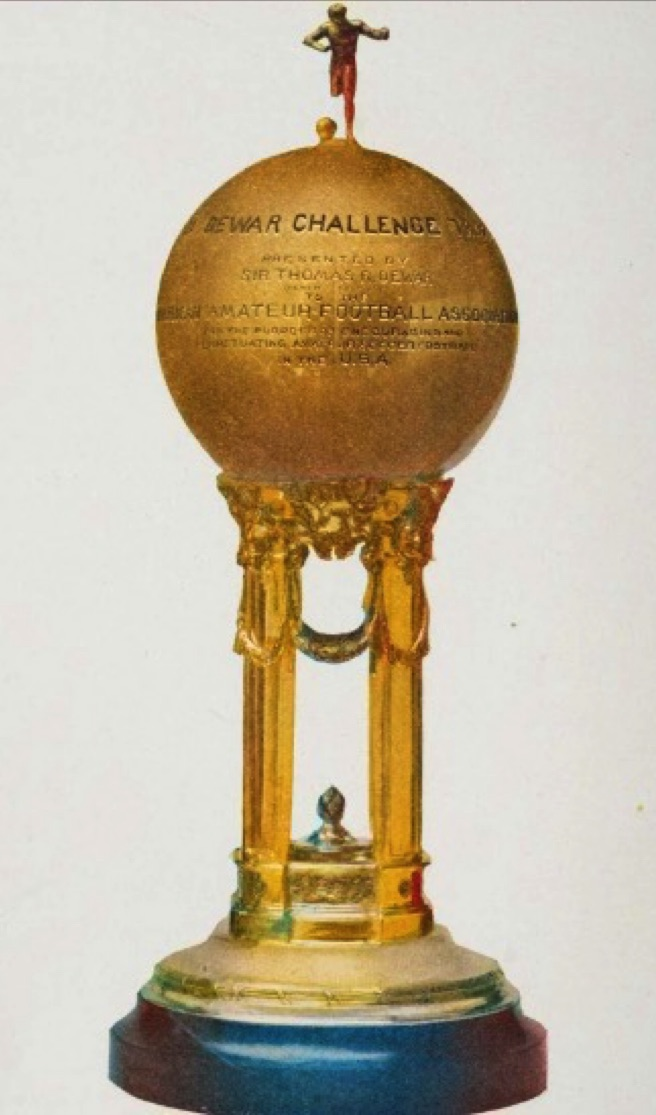
- The trophy awarded to champions
- Organiser(s): AAFA
- Founded: 1912
- Abolished: 1913; 113 years ago
- Region: United States
- Teams: 27
- Related competitions: National Challenge Cup
- Last champions: Yonkers (1913)
- Most championships: Brooklyn Celtic; Yonkers (1 title each)

The American Amateur Football Association Cup was an American soccer competition open to amateur teams affiliated with the American Amateur Football Association (AAFA).

The competition was held only two years, 1912 and 1913 before being superseded by the National Challenge Cup, now known as the Lamar Hunt U.S. Open Cup.

== History ==
In an October 1911 meeting, the New York State Football Association created the American Amateur Football Association (AAFA) and tasked it with standardizing rules and procedures for U.S. soccer. In 1912, the AAFA initiated a national cup open to all amateur U.S. teams. Despite the national invitation, only twenty-seven teams from the New York area entered along with one from Maryland. The AAFA had headquarters at the Astor House in New York City. The officers of the association were Dr. G.R. Manning (president), William A. Campbell (vice-president), C.C. Pickford (treasurer), Thomas W. Cahill (secretary). Organizations affiliated with the AAFA included the New York and District Amateur League, Metropolitan and District Amateur League, Utah Association Foot Ball Union, Michigan State Soccer Foot Ball League, Pittsburgh Press Soccer League, Association Foot Ball League of St. Louis and The Tribune Soccer League.

== Champions ==
=== List of finals ===
Ed.	Year	Champion	Score	Runner-up
1	1912	Brooklyn Celtic	3–0	Newark
2	1913	Yonkers	3–0	Hollywood Inn
