= 1910–11 National Association Foot Ball League season =

National Association Foot Ball League
- Season: 1910–11
- Champion(s): Jersey A.C. (1st title)
- Matches: 51

Statistics of National Association Foot Ball League in season 1910–11.

Before the season, Newark F.C. returned to the league. After the season, Newark F.C. withdrew.

== League standings ==
Position	Team	Pts	Pld	W	L	T
1	Jersey A.C.	19	13	8	2	3
2	Paterson Wilberforce	18	14	8	4	2
3	Paterson Rangers	17	14	6	3	5
4	West Hudson A.A.	14	14	6	6	2
5	Newark F.C.	14	14	6	6	2
6	Paterson True Blues	10	11	4	5	2
7	Brooklyn F.C.	5	10	1	6	3
8	Kearny Scots	5	12	2	9	1
