= Harry Shanholt =

Personal information
- Full name: Henry Harris Shanholt
- Date of birth: 1892
- Date of death: 1949 (aged 56–57)
- Position: Forward

Youth career
- 1912–1915: Columbia Lions

Senior career*
Years	Team	Apps	(Gls)
1912	Central YMCA		
1913–1915	Brooklyn Field Club		
1917	Jersey City		
1919–1920	Brooklyn Robins Dry Dock		
- * Club domestic league appearances and goals

Henry “Harry” Harris Shanholt was an early twentieth century collegiate All American American soccer player who played in the first National Challenge Cup.

== Soccer ==
=== Club ===
Unraveling Shanholt's career is difficult because he had a cousin, Harry “H.” Shanholt who had a career simultaneous with Henry Harris “H.H.” Shanholt.

Shanholt graduated from Boys High School where he was the school's star soccer forward. He attended Columbia University, playing on the school's soccer team from 1912 to 1915. He was a 1913 and 1914 First Team All American and team captain in 1914 and 1915. Even during his college years, Shanholt also played for local club teams. In 1912, he scored the winning goal as Central YMCA took the Field Club League championship. In 1913, he joined Brooklyn Field Club with whom he won the 1914 National Challenge Cup. He scored 11 goals across all competitions for Brooklyn that season. According to the 1914-1915 Spalding Soccer Football Guide, Shanholt's cousin was a reserve player with Brooklyn. Shanholt continued to play for Brooklyn through the 1914–1915 season, but left the team on October 18, 1915. In 1916, he graduated from Columbia with a bachelor's degree in mathematics. In the fall of 1917, Shanholt played for Jersey City. In 1919, Shanholt joined Brooklyn Robins Dry Dock for one season.

=== International ===
In 1916, Shanholt was called up to the United States men's national soccer team for its European tour. He declined to join the team in order to finish his master's degree at Columbia.

== Cricket ==
Shanholt also played cricket.

== Teacher ==
In October 1916, Shanholt gained a license as a high school mathematics “teacher in training”. He taught five years at Stuyvesant High School and three years at Rhodes Preparatory School. In 1923, he taught at The University Preparatory School. By 1949, he was the head of mathematics at Abraham Lincoln High School. Shanholt cowrote numerous mathematics textbooks during the early 1940s.
