= 1907–08 American Cup =

Soccer tournament

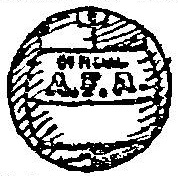

Tournament details
- Country: United States
- Teams: 19

Final positions
- Champions: West Hudson A.A. (2nd title)
- Runners-up: Paterson True Blues

Tournament statistics
- Matches played: 26
- Goals scored: 130 (5 per match)
- Top goal scorer: Fenwick (7)

The 1907–08 American Cup was the annual soccer tournament held by the American Football Association. The West Hudsons won the tournament for the second time in three years defeating the Paterson True Blues in the final as they did in 1906.

== Entries ==
Name	City	League	Manager	Grounds
West Hudson A.A.	Harrison, NJ	AFA	T.Adams	Harrison Oval
True Blue F.C.	Paterson, NJ	NAFL	T.Kenyon	Willard Park
Rover F.C.	Fall River, MA	NEL	L.L.Holden	Oak Grove Ave. Park
Clan McLeod	Jersey City, NJ	NYAFL Sat/Sun	T.Sims	West Side Park
Clark A.A.	East Newark, NJ	AFA	John Lone	A.C.Grounds, Passaic Avenue
Rangers	Paterson, NJ	NAFL	W.Ritchie	Willard Park
Newark F.C.	Newark, NJ	NAFL	J.Neil	Morris Park
Clan MacDonald	Brooklyn, NY	NAFL	D.Cardswell	Ridgewood Park
Caledonians	New York, NY	AFA	R.Hosie	Olympic Field
Clan McGregor	Yonkers, NY	NYAFL Sat	J.Barclay	League Park, Yonkers
Hollywood Inn	Yonkers, NY	NAFL	W.Scobie	Hollywood Field, Dunwoodie
Scottish American	Newark, NJ	NAFL	D.MacMillan	Vailsburg Track
Thistles	Philadelphia, PA	AFA	T.MacKenzie	Boys Club Farm
Howard & Bullough	Pawtucket	NEL	W.Allan	Salem Street
Hearts	Newark, NJ	NAFL	J.Holmes	Harrison Oval
St.Georges	Newark, NJ	AFA	A.Heath	Maplewood
Jersey A.C.	Bayonne	NAFL	S.Toma	Base Ball Grounds, J.C.
Clarendons	New York, NY	NYAFL Sun	F.Davies	Schuetzen Park, Union Hill
West Hudson Celtics	Kearny	AFA	A.Burns	Kearny Oval

NYAFL - New York State Amateur Association Football League, NAFL - National Association Football League, NEL - New England Association Football League

== First Round ==
The Newark Hearts, Fall River Rovers and Howard & Bullough drew byes.

October 20, 1907	West Hudson	1–1	Caledonian	Harrison, NJ
3:40 PM	Gorman 57'		Tait 25'	Stadium: Harrison Oval; Attendance: 1000; Referee: Harry Singleton

October 20, 1907	St. George	1–4	Hollywood Inn	Newark, NJ
	Crammond		Collins	Stadium: Morris Park

October 20, 1907	Thistles	7–1	Clarendon	Philadelphia, PA
	J. Kerr 5',, Jamie; Tennet, Stevenson		J. Lee	Attendance: 2000; Referee: J. Allen

October 27, 1907	Clan MacDonald	3–2	Scottish American	Brooklyn, NY
	Grant 10', 80',		Craig; Ross	Stadium: Ridgewood Park; Referee: J. Nesbitt (NY Caledonian)

October 27, 1907	Clan McLeod	10–0	West Hudson Celtic	Jersey City, NJ
				Stadium: West Side Park; Referee: David Shaw (Paterson True Blue)

October 27, 1907	Newark FC	8–3	Jersey AC	Newark, NJ
	Fenwick,,, John Leggett, Gray; Cuthill		Ronson; T.Waldron; J.Waldron	Stadium: Morris Park; Attendance: 200; Referee: A. Cochrane (Paterson)

October 27, 1907	Clark AA	5–1	Clan McGregor	East Newark, NJ
	Charley Fisher 3', Neilson; Taylor; Magee		Cameron	Stadium: Clark Athletic grounds Attendance: 800; Referee: J. Bannister (Paterson)

November 3, 1907	True Blue	4–0	Rangers	Paterson, NJ
3:00 PM	Peacey (pen.); Allen; Gilmore; Bissett			Stadium: Willard Park; Attendance: 2000; Referee: Samuel Stewart (Newark Hearts)

=== replays ===
October 26, 1907	West Hudson	4–1	Caledonian	Harrison, NJ
3:25 PM	Gorman 18', 28'; Lennox; Carter 85'		Tait 30'	Stadium: Harrison Oval; Attendance: 1200; Referee: James Allan (Kearny)

== Second Round ==
The second round draw was made on October 31, 1907, at the Continental Hotel in Newark, NJ. The True Blues, West Hudson, Clark AA, Clan McLeod and Clan MacDonald drew byes. The Thistle/Newark match was protested and ordered replayed.

November 16, 1907	Rovers	8–1	Hollywood Inn	Fall River, MA
3:05 PM	Bagley (o.g.); L.Gauthier,, Cannan 47'} Garside 49', 88'; Bagley 54'		Owens (o.g.)	Stadium: Athletic Grounds; Attendance: 1500; Referee: Wilkie (Kearny)

November 23, 1907	Thistles	2–1	Newark FC	Philadelphia, PA
	Smith 10', 25'		Fenwick	Stadium: Boys Club Farm; Attendance: 3000; Referee: H. Dale (New York)

December 1, 1907	Hearts	0–0	Howard & Bullough	Newark, NJ
				Stadium: Morris Park; Attendance: 800; Referee: Montgomery (Newark)

=== replays ===
December 7, 1907	Howard & Bullough	7–0	Hearts	Pawtucket, RI
3:00 PM	Dennison 5', Brown,, McAllister; McDermott			Stadium: Sabin Street grounds Attendance: 800; Referee: Crewcock

December 21, 1907	Thistles	3–3	Newark FC	Philadelphia, PA
	Alex Cairns, Stevenson		Fenwick, Cuthill	Stadium: Boys Club Farm; Referee: Harry Dale (New York)

January 18, 1908	Thistles	0–2	Newark FC	Philadelphia, PA
			Kemp 1'; John Leggett	Stadium: Boys Club Farm; Referee: Harry Dale (New York)

== Third round ==
The Rovers/Clark match was protested and ordered replayed.

December 25, 1907	Clan McLeod	3–2	Clan MacDonald	Jersey City, NJ
2:30 PM	Scott 5', 86'; Gillett		Russell 20'; Grant 70'	Stadium: West Side Park; Attendance: 500; Referee: A. Andrews (Newark)

December 28, 1907	Rovers	2–0	Clark AA	Fall River, MA
	Garside 33'; Riley			Stadium: Athletic Grounds; Attendance: 2500; Referee: Montgomery (Newark)

December 29, 1907	West Hudson	2–2	Howard & Bullough	Harrison, NJ
3:45 PM	Gorman 14'; Colville 82'		Brown 7'; McDermott	Stadium: Harrison Oval; Attendance: 3500; Referee: Nisbet (NY Caledonians)

March 1, 1908	Newark FC	1–1	True Blue	Newark, NJ
2:30 PM	John Leggett 75'		Gilmore 25'	Stadium: Morris Park; Attendance: 1000; Referee: Stewart (Rahway)

=== replays ===
January 4, 1908	Howard & Bullough	0–1	West Hudson	Pawtucket, RI
2:45 PM			Carter 35'	Stadium: Sabin Street grounds Attendance: 1000; Referee: John Nesbit (NY Caledonians)

January 18, 1908	Rovers	2–2	Clark AA	Fall River, MA
3:00 PM	Stone 70'; George Gauthier 86'		C.Fisher 15'; Neilson 17'	Stadium: Athletic Grounds; Attendance: 2500; Referee: Montgomery (Newark)

March 14, 1908	Rovers	4–2	Clark AA	Fall River, MA
3:00 PM	George Gauthier 47', Swords 77', 80'		Neilson 5'; C.Fisher 37'	Stadium: Athletic Grounds; Attendance: 2500; Referee: Allan Montgomery (Newark)

March 15, 1908	True Blue	4–1	Newark FC	Paterson, NJ
3:05 PM	Elliott; Mantle; Gilmore; Cooper		McInnis	Stadium: Willard Park; Attendance: 1000; Referee: J. Stewart (Rahway)

== Semifinals ==
March 29, 1908	West Hudson	8–0	Clan McLeod	Newark, NJ
	Christie 5'; Hackett 7',,, Lennox, 83'; Carter 47' (pen.)			Stadium: Morris Park; Attendance: 500; Referee: Stewart (Rahway)

March 29, 1908	True Blue	3–2	Rovers	Paterson, NJ
3:15PM	Billy Allen 12'; Charlie Gilmore 44'; Jimmy Cooper 65'		Cannane 70'; Swords 72'	Stadium: Willard Park; Attendance: 2,500; Referee: Harry Dale (Cameron F.C.)

== Final ==
April 19, 1908	West Hudson	3–2	True Blue	Newark, NJ
3:10PM	T. Dean 16', 42'; H. Carter 41'		J. Mantell 15'; Cooper 67'	Stadium: Morris Park; Attendance: 7,000; Referee: Allan Montgomery (Newark F.C.)
Note: True Blues: GK Garside, RFB Bissett, LFB Murray, RHB Fletcher, CHB McKinstrie, LHB Beattie, RW Mantell, RW Allan, CF Cooper, LW Gilmore, LW Elliott. West Hudson: GK Hanlon, RFB Brockie, LFB Kettles, RHB Miller, CHB Seddon, LHB Lawson, RW Dean, RW Knowles, CF Colville, LW Lennox, LW Carter.

== American Cup Bracket ==
Home teams listed on top of bracket

First Round
(New Jersey)	West Hudson A.A.	1–4
(New York (state))	Caledonians	1–1
(New Jersey)	Clan McLeod	10
(New Jersey)	West Hudson Celtics	0
(New York (state))	Clan MacDonald	3
(New Jersey)	Scottish Americans	2
(Pennsylvania)	Thistles	7
(New York (state))	Clarendons	1
(New Jersey)	Newark FC	8
(New Jersey)	Jersey A.C.	3
(New Jersey)	Paterson True Blues	4
(New Jersey)	Paterson Rangers	0
(New Jersey)	St.Georges	1
(New York (state))	Hollywood Inn	4
(New Jersey)	Clark A.A.	5
(New York (state))	Clan McGregor	1

Second Round
(New Jersey)	West Hudson A.A.
bye
(New Jersey)	Hearts	0–0
(Rhode Island)	Howard and Bullough	0–7
(New Jersey)	Clan McLeod
bye
(New York (state))	Clan MacDonald
bye
(Pennsylvania)	Thistles	2–3–0
(New Jersey)	Newark FC	1 (Note: Newark FC protested due to Thistles playing suspended player)–3–2
(New Jersey)	Paterson True Blues
bye
(Massachusetts)	Fall River Rovers	8
(New York (state))	Hollywood Inn	1
(New Jersey)	Clark A.A.
bye

Third Round
(New Jersey)	West Hudson A.A.	2–1
(Rhode Island)	Howard & Bullough	2–0
(New Jersey)	Clan McLeod	3
(New York (state))	Clan MacDonald	2
(New Jersey)	Newark FC	1–1
(New Jersey)	Paterson True Blues	1–4
(Massachusetts)	Fall River Rovers	2–2–4
(New Jersey)	Clark A.A.	0 (Note: Clark protested due to ineligible player)–2–2

Semifinals
(New Jersey)	West Hudson A.A.	8
(New Jersey)	Clan McLeod	0
(New Jersey)	Paterson True Blues	3
(Massachusetts)	Fall River Rovers	2

Finals
(New Jersey)	West Hudson A.A.	3
(New Jersey)	Paterson True Blues	2

== See also ==
- 1907–08 NAFBL
- 1907–08 SLSL
