= HIFC =

HIFC may refer to:

- Hollywood Inn F.C., an American soccer team based in Yonkers, New York
- Hubei Istar F.C., a Chinese football club based in Wuhan
