= Charles Drinkwater =

Charles or Charlie Drinkwater may refer to:

- Charles Graham Drinkwater (1875–1946), Canadian ice hockey player, businessman and philanthropist
- Charles Drinkwater (soccer), American soccer outside left
- Charlie Drinkwater, English footballer
- Charlie Drinkwater, English singer and lead singer of TV Priest
