= Percy Adamson =

American soccer player

Personal information
- Date of birth: April 10, 1889
- Place of birth: Adlington, Lancashire, U.K.
- Date of death: April 7, 1969 (aged 79)
- Height: 6 ft 0 in (1.83 m)
- Position: Center forward

Senior career*
Years	Team	Apps	(Gls)
- Brooklyn Field Club

Managerial career
- 1914: Columbia Lions
- * Club domestic league appearances and goals

Percy Adamson (April 10, 1889 – April 7, 1969) was an early twentieth-century British-born American inventor and soccer player. He is the inventor of lastex, and was captain of the Brooklyn Field Club when it won the 1914 National Challenge Cup.

== Early life and career ==
Born in Adlington, Lancashire on April 10, 1889, Adamson was one of five children—five boys and one girl—born to James and Eliza Ann Adamson. In the summer of 1910, the Adamsons emigrated to the United States. Following a one-week voyage aboard the RMS Caronia, the family disembarked at Ellis Island on July 31.

By November of that year, Adamson was playing with the Brooklyn Field Club, and in the spring of 1912, he filed his declaration of intent to become a naturalized U.S. citizen.

On May 16, 1914, Adamson scored the first goal in the final of the 1914 National Challenge Cup which was the first time this tournament was held. In September 1916, while living in Sheepshead Bay, New York he was still listed with the Brooklyn Field Club.

In September 1914, he became the head coach of the Columbia University soccer team.

== Personal life ==
From August 1914 until his death, Adamson was married to fellow British expat Lillian Dutton. The marriage produced two children, a son and daughter.

Adamson died, aged 79, on April 7, 1969, three days before his 80th birthday, at his home in Old Greenwich, Connecticut. He was survived by his wife and two children.
