= 1908–09 American Cup =

Soccer tournament

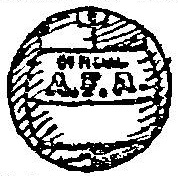

Tournament details
- Country: United States
- Teams: 20

Final positions
- Champions: Paterson True Blues (2nd title)
- Runners-up: East Newark Clark A.A.

Tournament statistics
- Matches played: 24
- Goals scored: 79 (3.29 per match)

The 1908–09 American Cup was the 18th edition of the American Cup an annual soccer tournament held by the American Football Association.

== Participants ==
Name	City	League
West Hudson A.A.	Harrison	NAFL
True Blue F.C.	Paterson	NAFL
Rover F.C.	Fall River	NEL
Cameron	New York	NYAFL Sat/Sun
Clark A.A.	East Newark	NAFL
Rangers	Paterson	NAFL
Newark F.C.	Newark	NAFL
Clan McDonald	Brooklyn	NYAFL Sun
Caledonian	New York	NYAFL Sat
Caledonian	Trenton	CCAFL
Hollywood Inn	Yonkers	NYAFL Sat
Scottish American	Newark	NAFL
Thistles	Philadelphia	FBAP
Howard & Bullough	Pawtucket	NEL
Elite	Trenton	CCAFL
Brooklyn	Brooklyn	NYAFL Sat
Jersey A.C.	Jersey City	AFA
British American	Philadelphia	FBAP
Critchley	Brooklyn	NYAFL Sun
Arcadia Thistle	Brooklyn	NYAFL Sun

NYAFL - New York State Amateur Association Football League
NAFL - National Association Football League
NEL - New England Association Football League
CCAFL - Capital City Association Football League
FBAP - Foot Ball Association of Pennsylvania

== First round ==
October 24, 1908	Trenton Caledonian	3–4	Cameron	Bowman Field, Trenton, NJ
3:30 PM	Hall, Reid		Isaacs; Hastings; Cameron	Referee: Allan Montgomery (Newark)

October 25, 1908	Scottish American	1–1	Clark AA	Wiedenmayer's Park, Newark, NJ
	Richardson 42'		Martin 85'	Attendance: 1500; Referee: J. Nesbitt (New York)

October 31, 1908	NY Caledonian	3–4	Hollywood Inn	Cannon's Park, Westchester, NY
	Cummings; Lever; Tait		Gibbs,, McLeod	Referee: V. Lebris

October 31, 1908	Rovers	1–0	West Hudson	Athletic grounds, Fall River, MA
3:00 PM	George Gauthier 35'			Attendance: 2000; Referee: John Stewart (Rahway)

=== replays ===
November 1, 1908	Clark AA	2–0	Scottish American	Clark Athletic grounds, East Newark, NJ
	Charles Fisher 30', (pen.)			Attendance: 2500; Referee: James Nisbet (New York)

November 7, 1908	NY Caledonian	0–2	Hollywood Inn	Cannon's Park, Westchester, NY
			Hill; Tully	Referee: Kearns

== Second round ==
The second round draw took place at Newark, NJ on November 7, 1908. The Jersey AC/British American match ended ten minutes early on account of darkness and was ordered replayed. British later forfeited the replay. The Thistles also withdrew from the competition when the AFA decided to order a replay of their match with the Rovers.

November 26, 1908	Elite	1–1	Clan McDonald	Hetzel Grove, Trenton, NJ
	Cooper		Hoyle	Referee: Singleton (Newark)

November 28, 1908	Thistles	1–0	Rovers	Central Park, Philadelphia, PA
	A. Cairns 65'			Attendance: 1200; Referee: V.F.Kearns (Bloomfield)

November 28, 1908	Brooklyn	1–2	Howard & Bullough	Marquette Oval, Brooklyn, NY
	R. Milne 10' (pen.)		Dennison; E. Pemberton	Referee: J. W. Stuart

November 29, 1908	Jersey AC	3–0	British Americans	Danforth Avenue Grounds, Jersey City, NJ
	C. Zehnbauer 10'; Ronson (pen.); Kettles			Referee: Al Montgomery (Newark)

November 29, 1908	Critchley	0–1	Newark	Meyerrose Park, Ridgewood, NY
3:00 PM			Dave Piggins 10'

November 29, 1908	Arcadia Thistle	2–3	Cameron	Visitation Park, Brooklyn, NY
3:00 PM	Scullion; Wilson		Hastings; Isaacs; Bissett 85'	Referee: A. H. Dale

November 29, 1908	True Blues	2–1	Rangers	Willard Park, Paterson, NJ
3:00 PM	Morel 10'; Gilmore 40'		Ward 7'	Referee: J. Nesbitt (Brooklyn)

November 29, 1908	Clark A.A.	5–2	Hollywood Inn	Clark Grounds, East Newark, NJ
3:00 PM	Charley Fisher,, Beebe; Forfer		Cooper; Duffes	Referee: J. Neal (Paterson)

=== replays ===
December 6, 1908	Clan McDonald	3–2	Elite	Marquette Oval, Brooklyn, NY
	Scott, (pen.); McCulloch		Hewitt; McCafferty	Attendance: 500; Referee: Singleton (Newark)

December 13, 1908	Jersey AC	w/o	British Americans	Danforth Avenue Grounds, Greenville, NJ
3:00 PM

== Third round ==
The draw for the third round of the American Cup took place at the Continental Hotel in Newark, NJ on December 3, 1908. The True Blue/H & B match was protested on account of ineligible players and ordered replayed.

December 27, 1908	Clark A.A.	1–0	Clan MacDonald	Clark. grounds, East Newark, NJ
	Robert Martin 74'			Referee: John Nisbet (New York)

December 27, 1908	True Blue	0–1	Howard & Bullough	Willard Park, Paterson, NJ
3:00 PM			Eddie Pemberton 20'	Attendance: 2000; Referee: Kearn (New York)

December 27, 1908	Rovers	6–1	Newark	Athletic ground, Fall River, MA
3:00 PM	Mickey Cannane 35',, George Gauthier, Tommy Swords		Bucken 87'	Attendance: 1500; Referee: J. Montgomery (Newark)

January 1, 1909	Cameron	1–1	Jersey A.C.	Williamsbridge, NY
	Bissett		C. Zehnbauer	Referee: A. Kearns

=== replays ===
January 10, 1909	Jersey A.C.	1–1	Cameron	Greenville, NJ
	J. Zehnbauer 10'		J. Isaacs 60' (pen.)	Referee: Hearns (Bloomfield)

February 21, 1909	True Blue	2–0	Howard & Bullough	Willard Park, Paterson, NJ
3:00 PM	Andy Chambers; Spinnler			Attendance: 1500; Referee: Cairns (Bloomfield)

February 28, 1909	Jersey A.C.	2–0 (a.e.t.)	Cameron	Willard Park, Paterson, NJ
	W. Kittles (ET); Joe Zehnbauer (ET)		Goal	Referee: J. Nesbit (New York)

== Semifinals ==
March 20, 1909	Clark A.A.	2–0	Rovers	Clark Athletic grounds, East Newark
3:00PM	Martin (2H); Charley Fisher (2H)			Attendance: 3000; Referee: Alan Montgomery (Kearny)

March 28, 1909	True Blue	4–3	Jersey A.C.	Willard Park, Paterson, NJ
3:00PM	Steve Fletcher (1H); Andy Chambers (1H)		Joe Zehnbauer, Charlie Zehnbauer	Referee: J. Kearns

== Final ==
April 18, 1909	Paterson True Blues (NJ)	1–1	East Newark Clark A.A. (NJ)	Harrison Oval
	Dunnachie 80' (pen.)		6' Charley Fisher 6' (pen.)	Attendance: 4000; Referee: James Nesbitt

=== Replay ===
May 2, 1909	Paterson True Blues (NJ)	2–1	East Newark Clark A.A. (NJ)	Harrison Oval
	Spindler 18'; Fletcher		Johnny Young 67'	Attendance: 10,000; Referee: James Nesbitt
Note: Paterson True Blues: GK Garside, DF Murray, McClellan, MF MacInstri, Stewart, Chambers, FW Spindler, Fletcher, McWinnie, Gilmour, Donechie. Clark A.A.: GK Hunt, DF Tomar, T.Fisher, MF Lone, Porter, Foster, FW C.Fisher, Maitland, Martin, Young, Neilson.

== American Cup Bracket ==
Home teams listed on top of bracket

First Round
(New Jersey)	Trenton Caldonians	3
(New York (state))	Cameron	4
(New Jersey)	Scottish American	1–0
(New Jersey)	Clark A.A.	1–2
(New York (state))	New York Caldonians	3 (Note: Caledonians protest and game was ordered replayed)–0
(New York (state))	Hollywood Inn	4–2
(Massachusetts)	Fall River Rovers	1
(New Jersey)	West Hudson A.A.	0

Second Round
(New Jersey)	Paterson True Blues	2
(New Jersey)	Paterson Rangers	1
(New York (state))	Brooklyn FC	1
(New Jersey)	Howard and Bullough	2
(New Jersey)	Jersey A.C.	3–w/o
(Pennsylvania)	British American	0 (Note: British American protested due to game being called 10 minutes early)
(New York (state))	Arcadia Thistle	2
(New York (state))	Cameron	3
(New Jersey)	Clark A.A.	5
(New York (state))	Hollywood Inn	2
(New Jersey)	Elite	1–2
(New York (state))	Clan McDonald	1–3
(Pennsylvania)	Thistles	1
(Massachusetts)	Fall River Rovers	0
(New York (state))	Critchley	0
(New Jersey)	Newark	1

Third Round
(New Jersey)	Paterson True Blues	0 (Note: True Blues protested due to Howard & Bullough playing with ineligible players)–2
(Rhode Island)	Howard & Bullough	1–0
(New Jersey)	Jersey A.C.	1–1-2
(New York (state))	Brooklyn Camerons	1–1-0
(New Jersey)	Clark A.A.	1
(New York (state))	Clan MacDonald	0
(Massachusetts)	Fall River Rovers	6
(New Jersey)	Newark F.C.	1

Semifinals
(New Jersey)	Paterson True Blues	4
(New Jersey)	Jersey A.C.	3
(New Jersey)	Clark A.A.	2
(Massachusetts)	Fall River Rovers	0

Finals
(New Jersey)	Paterson True Blues	1-2
(New Jersey)	Clark A.A.	1-1

== See also ==
- 1908–09 NAFBL
- 1908–09 SLSL
