= Frank Mather =

Frank Mather may refer to:

- Frank Jewett Mather (1868–1953), American art critic and professor
- Frank Mather (footballer), English football goalkeeper
