= Roses F.C. (1910–1923) =

Roses F.C., of Detroit, Michigan, was an early twentieth century U.S. soccer team formed in 1910.

== History ==
In 1910, Roses won the 'B' division of the Detroit and District league but lost the overall final against the 'A' division winner. The following season they won the Michigan State Soccer Football League (MSSFL) championship. In 1917, Roses won the Michigan state championship. The next league result came in 1918 when Roses won the Detroit District League (DDL). In 1919, Roses won both the Michigan State Association Clan Campbell Trophy and the Detroit and District League championship. They repeated as DDL champions in 1922 and 1923. As for the National Challenge Cup, Roses entered every cup from the first in 1914 until at least the 1923 version. In 1914 Roses was eliminated in the third round. Its best year came in 1919 when they lost to Bricklayers and Masons F.C. in the quarterfinals. The team was active through at least the 1925-1926 season.

== Year-by-year ==
Year	League	Reg. season	National Challenge Cup
1909/10	D&DL	1st B	N/A
1910/11	MSSL	1st	N/A
1911/12	?	?	N/A
1912/13	?	?	N/A
1913/14	?	?	Third round
1914/15	?	?	Second round
1915/16	?	?	?
1916/17	?	?	First round
1917/18	DDL	1st	Second round
1918/19	DDL	1st	Quarterfinal
1919/20	?	?	?
1920/21	CSL	?	Second round
1921/22	DDL	1st	Third round
1922/23	DDL	1st	Third round

== Honors ==
Clan Campbell Trophy

- Winner (1): 1919

League Championship

- Winner (5): 1914, 1918, 1919, 1922, 1923
