= Clark A.A. =

Former soccer team from New Jersey, U.S.

- Full name: Clark A.A.
- Founded: 1906
- Head coach: John C.Savage
- League: NAFBL

Clark Athletic Association, also known as East Newark Clark A.A., was a U.S. soccer team sponsored by the Clark Mile End Spool Cotton Company. It spent two seasons in the National Association Football League where it was co-champion in 1909.

== History ==
=== Name ===
Clark A.A. was established in May 1906 by employees of the Clark Mile End Spool Cotton Company and Clark FNT. The team first took up baseball. After a successful baseball season, Clark A.A., managed by John C. Savage, began playing the soccer season. The team was built around a core of players from the champion West Hudson A.A. Its first game was on September 3, 1906, a 5-0 win against the Bronx Rangers. The team also took part in the American Cup. While the company factory was located in Newark, on the west bank of the Passaic River, the team played at Clark Field located on the east side of the river, an area known as East Newark. This gave rise to the team’s alternate name, the East Newark Clark A.A.

=== Competition ===
In 1906, the team entered the National Association Football League. They lasted only one season, then dropped out, but in 1907, they won the American Cup. This time they were listed incorrectly as Kearny Clark as many sportswriters frequently confused Kearny and East Newark. In 1908, Clark A.A. rejoined the NAFBL, finishing the season tied for first with West Hudson A.A. Clark again withdrew from the league. They finished runner up in the 1909 American Cup final to the Paterson True Blues. Reports from November 1909 show that Clark A.A. had become an amateur team playing in the American Cup.

== Year-by-year ==
Year	League	Reg. season	American Cup
1906/07	NAFBL	5th	Champion
1907/08	?	?	Third Round
1908/09	NAFBL	1st	Final
1909/10	?	?	First Round

== Honors ==
American Cup

- Winner (1): 1907
- Runner Up (1): 1909

League Championship

- Winner (1): 1909
