= 1913–14 National Challenge Cup =

American soccer tournament season

- Dewar Challenge Cup

Tournament details
- Country: United States
- Teams: 40

Final positions
- Champions: Brooklyn Field Club (1st title)
- Runners-up: Brooklyn Celtic

Tournament statistics
- Matches played: 39
- Goals scored: 159 (4.08 per match)

The 1913–14 National Challenge Cup was the inaugural edition of the national knock-out soccer competition in the United States that would eventually become the modern-day Lamar Hunt U.S. Open Cup. Brooklyn Field Club won the title.

The competition ran alongside the 1914 American Cup, an older, similar competition organized by the American Football Association (AFA). At the time, two different organizations vied for recognition as the official national association for American soccer, the predominantly north-eastern AFA and the organizers of the Challenge Cup, the newly named United States Football Association. The organizers of the National Challenge Cup prevailed, and the 1913-14 competition is thus recognized as that years national cup tournament, and the inaugural edition of what is now the U.S. Open Cup.

The second round drawing took place on November 9, 1913.

== Bracket ==
Home teams listed on top of bracket

First Round; November 1 – 2
NY	Brooklyn F.C.	1
NY	IRT Strollers	0
NY	Brooklyn Rangers
Bye
PA	Braddock
Bye
PA	Bethlehem Steel	7
PA	Disston A.A.	0
NY	Yonkers F.C.
Bye
NY	Fulton A.C.
Bye
NY	New York Celtic
Bye
NY	German F.C.	5
NY	Cameron F.C.	0
MA	New Bedford F.C.	3
MA	Farr Alpaca F.C.	1
CT	Bridgeport Presby.
Bye
PA	W. Philadelphia F.C.
Bye
PA	Tacony F.C.	w/o
PA	Kensington F.C.
PA	Peabody F.C.
Bye
PA	Wissinoming F.C.
Bye
NY	St. George F.C.
Bye
NY	Hudson United F.C.
Bye
NY	Brooklyn Celtic
Bye
NY	Hollywood Inn F.C.
Bye
NJ	Watsessing F.C.
Bye
NJ	Babcock & Wilcox	6
NJ	Cowboy F.C.	2
NY	Columbia Oval F.C.
Bye
NY	Clan Mackenzie F.C.
Bye
NJ	West Hudson Juniors
Bye
NJ	Harrison Alley Boys	8
NJ	C.S. Jersey Blues FC	5
MI	Roses F.C.
Bye
MI	Packard F.C.
Bye
NY	MacNaughton Rang.
Bye
NY	Niagara Falls Rangers	6
NY	Buffalo Corinthians	1
IL	McDuffs
Bye
IL	Hyde Park Blues
Bye
IL	Campbell F.C.
Bye
IL	Pullman F.C.
Bye

Second Round; November 30 – December 21
NY	Brooklyn F.C.	3
NY	Brooklyn Rangers	0
PA	Braddock	2
PA	Bethlehem Steel (a.e.t.)	3
NY	Yonkers F.C.	3
NY	Fulton A.C.	0
NY	New York Celtic	4
NY	German F.C.	1
MA	New Bedford F.C.	3
CT	Bridgeport Presby.	0
PA	W. Philadelphia F.C.	4
PA	Kensington F.C.	1
PA	Peabody F.C.	3*
PA	Wissinoming F.C.	0*
NY	St. George F.C.	2**
NY	Hudson United F.C.	0**
NY	Brooklyn Celtic	6
NY	Hollywood Inn F.C.	0
NJ	Watsessing F.C.	3
NJ	Babcock & Wilcox	5
NY	Columbia Oval F.C.	5
NY	Clan Mackenzie F.C.	2
NJ	West Hudson Juniors	0*
NJ	Harrison Alley Boys	4*
MI	Roses F.C.	2*
MI	Packard F.C.	1*
NY	MacNaughton Rang.	w/o
NY	Niagara Falls Rangers
IL	McDuffs	0
IL	Hyde Park Blues	2
IL	Campbell F.C.	0
IL	Pullman F.C.	3

Third Round; January 18 – March 8
NY	Brooklyn F.C.	1
PA	Bethlehem Steel	0
NY	Yonkers F.C.	3
NY	New York Celtic	1
MA	New Bedford F.C.	2
PA	W. Philadelphia F.C.	0
PA	Peabody F.C.	w/o
NY	St. George F.C.
NY	Brooklyn Celtic	5
NJ	Babcock & Wilcox	0
NY	Columbia Oval F.C.	2
NJ	Harrison Alley Boys	1
MI	Roses F.C.	0
NY	Niagara Falls Rangers	2
IL	Hyde Park Blues	2
IL	Pullman F.C.	4

Quarterfinals; March 21 – April 5
NY	Brooklyn F.C.	4
NY	Yonkers F.C.	1
MA	New Bedford F.C.	4*
PA	Peabody F.C.	1*
NY	Brooklyn Celtic	2
NY	Columbia Oval F.C.	0
NY	Niagara Falls Rangers	2
IL	Pullman F.C.	1

Semifinals; April 18 – 26
NY	Brooklyn F.C.	2
MA	New Bedford F.C.	1
NY	Brooklyn Celtic	6
NY	Niagara Falls Rangers	2

Final; May 16
NY	Brooklyn F.C.	2
NY	Brooklyn Celtic	1

(*) replay after tied match
w/o walkover/forfeit victory awarded

== Final ==
May 16, 1914

Brooklyn Field Club (NY)	2–1	(NY) Brooklyn Celtic
Adamson 3'; Ford 87'	Report	Campion 27' (pen.)

Coates Field, Pawtucket, Rhode Island
Attendance: 10,000
Referee: Charles Creighton (USA)
- (Scotland) W. Haughie
- (Scotland) H. Hinds or Hynds
- (United States) Charles Drinkwater
- (England) H. W. Matthews
- (Scotland) Neil Clark
- (United States) Nichols
- (United States) James Ford
- (United States) George Knowles
- (United States) Percy Adamson (c)
- (United States) Robert Millar
- (United States) Harry Shanholt
- Manager:
- (England) Frank Mather
- (United States) James Robertson
- (Scotland) Andrew Robertson
- (Republic of Ireland) Hugh Kelly
- (Republic of Ireland) David Flanagan
- (Republic of Ireland) Frank O'Hara
- (Republic of Ireland) Albert Lonie
- (Republic of Ireland) Thomas Campion
- (Republic of Ireland) Roddy O'Halloran (c)
- (Republic of Ireland) Thomas McGreevey
- (Republic of Ireland) Paddy Butler
- Manager: Thomas McCamphill

== See also ==
- 1914 American Cup
