= 1906–07 American Cup =

Soccer tournament

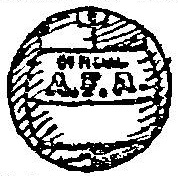

Tournament details
- Country: United States
- Teams: 14

Final positions
- Champions: Clark A.A. (1st title)
- Runners-up: Scottish American

Tournament statistics
- Matches played: 16
- Goals scored: 66 (4.13 per match)

The 1906–07 American Cup was the sixteenth edition of the soccer tournament organized by the American Football Association. The Clark Athletic Association won the final match against the Scottish Americans.

== Entries ==
There were fourteen participants in the 1906–07 AFA tournament.

| Name | City | League | Manager | Grounds |
|---|---|---|---|---|
| Robert Burns Association | New York, NY | NAFL/NYSL | H.Holden | West NY Baseball Grounds |
| Clark A.A. | East Newark, NJ | NAFL | William Harrison | Clark Association Grounds |
| Gordon Rangers | New York, NY | NAFL/MAFL | James Young | Bronx |
| Hearts | Newark, NJ | NAFL | - | Harrison Oval |
| Hollywood Inn | Yonkers, NY | MAFL | - | Hollywood Inn Field |
| Jersey A.C. | Greenville, NJ | AFA | - | Park |
| Kearny A.C. | Kearny, NJ | NAFL | James Burke | Park |
| Newark F.C. | Newark, NJ | NAFL/MAFL | W.Mulholen | Morris Park |
| Rangers | Paterson, NJ | NAFL | J.Swithenby | Ryle Park |
| Scottish American | Newark, NJ | NAFL | - | Wiedenmayer's Park |
| St. George United | Bloomfield, NJ | AFA | Samuel Reynolds | Heidelberg Park |
| The Essex County Football Club | East Newark, NJ | NAFL/MAFL | William Chapman | Morris Park |
| True Blue | Paterson, NJ | NAFL | Kenyen | Ryle Park |
| West Hudson | Newark, NJ | NAFL/MAFL | Robert Marshall | Harrison Oval |

MAFL - Metropolitan Association Football League, NAFL - National Association Football League, NYSL - New York State Amateur Association Football League

== First round ==
The first round was due to be completed by October 28. The Essex County Football Club and Jersey A.C. drew byes.

| October 27, 1906 | Hollywood Inn | 5–1 | Hearts | Dunwoodie, NY |
| | | | | Stadium: Hollywood Inn Field; Referee: William Bannister Robert Dunn (Paterson) |

| October 28, 1906 | Scottish American | 1–0 | Paterson Rangers | Newark, NJ |
| 1:00PM | 8McMillan 80' | | | Stadium: Morris Park; Referee: James Caldwell (New York) |
Note: Scottish: GK Mills, LB Rennie, RB Wilson, LHB Craig, CHB Raff, RHB Ryan, OL Saulds, IL Laure, CF McMillan, IR Tate, OR McGee. Rangers: GK Wilson, LB Martin, RB Toman, LHB Nichol, CHB Carr, RHB Blyght, OL Connors, IL Carlor, CF Dunn, IR Latchford, OR Brooks.

| October 28, 1906 | Clark A.A. | 1–1 | Kearny A.C. | East Newark, NJ |
| 3:40PM | McMahon 49' (o.g.); Faul 79' | | | Stadium: Clark Athletic grounds Attendance: 2,000; Referee: Robert Morrison (Burns Club) |
Note: Clark: GK Hunt, LB Donald, RB McMahon, LHB Lone, CHB Mason, RHB Young, LW Neilson, Earle, CF McNeill, RW Faul, Charles Fisher. Kearny: GK Kelly, LB McCarthy, RB Grames, LHB Hamilton, CHB Mohan, RHB Scott, LW McGee, McGarry, CF Partridge, RW L.Fisher, Kettles.

| October 28, 1906 | Newark F.C. | 7–0 | St. George United | Newark, NJ |
| 3:30PM | ,,, (1H),, (2H) | | | Stadium: Morris Park; Referee: A. Andrews (Newark) |
Note: St.George: GK Walkland, FB Waldon, Tart, HB Thorn, Hill, Matthews, FW Heath, Davis, Hodson, Harding, Woodcroft. Newark: GK Beckett, FB W.Purdie, Leggett, HB H.Purdie, A.Purdie, McKay, FW Cuthill, Gray, Nuttall, Jarvis, Dunlop.

| October 28, 1906 | West Hudson | 1–0* | Burns Club | East Newark, NJ |
| | | | | Stadium: Olympic Park; Referee: David Shaw (Paterson) |
Note: Burns Club forfeited. West Hudson awarded game 1–0.

| October 28, 1906 | True Blue | 2–2 | Gordon Rangers | Paterson, NJ |
| 3:15PM | Lauder; Crichton | | McGruer 80', 81' | Stadium: Ryle Park; Attendance: 1,000; Referee: Allan Montgomery (Newark) |
Note: True Blue: GK Miller, LB T.Murray, RB Bissett, LHB Robertson, CHB Smith, RHB Beattie, OL G.Murray, IL Beales, CF Crichton, IR Lauder, OR Peacey. Gordon: GK Ramsey, LB Caldwell, RB Thomson, LHB Forrest, CHB Porter, RHB Hillman, OL Drinkwater, IL Bruntin, CF Groves, IR Hamilton, OR McGruer.

=== replays ===
| November 3, 1906 | Clark A.A. | 4–1 | Kearny A.C. | East Newark, NJ |
| 3:30PM | T.Fisher 35'; Faull 51', 85'; C.Fisher | | McGarry 10' | Stadium: Clark Athletic grounds Referee: Robert Morrison (New York) |

| November 4, 1906 | True Blue | 3–1 | Gordon Rangers | Paterson, NJ |
| 3:15PM | Elliott, Beattie | | Hamilton | Stadium: Ryle Park; Attendance: 1,200; Referee: Allan Montgomery (Newark) |
Note: True Blue: GK Miller, FB Spencer, Bissett, HB Robertson, Murray, Beattie, FW Elliott, Oldfield, Crichton, Peacey, Murray. Gordon: GK Ramsay, FB Denholm, Thomson, HB Forest, Porter, Hillman, FW Drinkwater, Caldwell, Hill, Hamilton, McGruen.

== Second round ==
The second round draw was held November 2, 1906 at the Continental Hotel in Newark, New Jersey. The contests were to be completed by December 2.

| December 2, 1906 | Clark A.A. | 4–0 | West Hudson | East Newark, NJ |
| 3:00PM | T. Fisher 4'; McNeill, C. Fisher | | | Stadium: Clark Athletic grounds Attendance: 3,500; Referee: P. Hughes (East Newark) |
Note: Clark: GK Hunt, FB Donald, McMahon, HB Lone, Mason, Young, LW Neilson, T.Fisher, CF McNeill, RW Faull, Charles Fisher. West Hudson: GK Kenworthy, FB Brockie, Kettles, HB Reid, Lawson, Hackett, FW Dean, Tait, Gorman, Lennox, Miller.

| November 18, 1906 | Scottish American | 5–0 | Jersey A.C. | East Newark, NJ |
| 3:00PM | McGee 35', Cale 44'; Ross; Laurie | | | Stadium: Clark Athletic ground Attendance: 500; Referee: Allan Montgomery (Newark) |
Note: Scottish: GK Miles, FB Rennie, Wilson, HB Craig, Ross, Roy, LW Cale, Laurie, CF McGee, RW J.McMillan, W.McMillan. Jersey: GK Wagner, FB Golz, Anderson, HB J.Waldron, Bishop, J.Miller, LW White, Davis, CF Taylor, RW T.Miller, T.Waldron.

| November 25, 1906 | Newark F.C. | 0–0 | Hollywood Inn | Newark, NJ |
| | | | | Stadium: Morris Park; Referee: A. Andrews (Newark) |
Note: Newark: GK Beckett, FB Sedden, Leggett, HB McNeil, A.Purdie, McKay, FW Cuthill, McLeod, Nuttall, McInness, Dunlop. Hollywood: GK McArdle, FB Leverie, Mathieson, HB Braidwood, Brydin, Wyllie, FW Thorne, McFarlane, Cameron, Salmond, Christie.

| December 2, 1906 | True Blue | 8–2 | Essex County | Paterson, NJ |
| | G.Murray, T.Murray; Oldfield,, Peacey; Elliott | | Greenhaigh; Piggins | Stadium: Ryle Park; Attendance: 350; Referee: Hugh McWilkie |
Note: True Blue: GK Miller, FB Tommy Murray(Cockran), Bissett, HB Robertson, McKinstrie, Beattie, FW Elliott, Jimmy Oldfield, Cockran(T.Murray), Tommy Peacey, George Murray. Essex: GK Coleman, FB Keller, Coleclough, HB Robinson, Maxwell, Dunn, FW McMullen, Tabele, Greenhaigh, Piggins, Marshall.

=== replay ===
| December 2, 1906 | Newark F.C. | 2–0 | Hollywood Inn | Newark, NJ |
| | | | Chrystie 50'; Cameron 60' | Stadium: Morris Park; Referee: McAndrews |
Note: Newark: GK Beckett, FB Gray, Leggett, HB McNeil, A.Purdie, McKay, FW Cuthill, McLeod, Nuttall, W.Purdie, Dunlop. Hollywood: GK McArdle, FB Ovens, Mathieson, HB Braidwood, Bryden, Wylie, FW Laverly, MacFarlane, Cameron, Salmon, Chrystie.

== Semifinals ==
The semifinal round was drawn on December 15, 1906, at the Continental Hotel in Newark, NJ. The games were due to be completed by February 10, 1907.

| January 27, 1907 | Scottish American | 9–2 | Hollywood Inn | East Newark, NJ |
| | J.McMillan 5' (1H); McGee (1H); Faulds (1H) | | Laverly (2H) | Stadium: Clark Athletic ground Attendance: 1,500; Referee: Allan Montgomery (Newark) |
Note: Scottish: GK Miles, FB Rennie, Laurie, HB Crammond, Ross, Roy, LW W.McMillan, Faulds, CF J.McMillan, RW Craig, McGee. Hollywood: GK McArdle, FB Braidwood, Mathieson, HB Jeffreys, Braidwood, Wylie, RW Kane, Laverly, CF Cameron, LW Salmond, Christie.

| April 7, 1907 | Clark A.A. | 1–0 | True Blue | East Newark, NJ |
| 3:30PM | Mason 65' | | | Stadium: Clark Athletic grounds Attendance: 4,000; Referee: Dale (New York) |
Note: Clark: GK Hunt, FB Donald, Swiss, HB Lone, Mason, Young, FW Neilson, C.Fisher, CF Bowden, RW Fenwick, G. Fisher. True Blue: GK Miller, FB Smith, Bissett, HB Robertson, McKinstrie, Beattie, LW Elliott, Murray, CF Crichton, RW Peacy, Oldfield.

== Final ==
| April 21, 1907 | Clark A.A. | 4–0 | Scottish American | Newark, NJ |
| 3:29PM | C. Fisher 1'; McNeil 33'; Fenwick 35', 67' | | | Stadium: Morris Park; Attendance: 5,000; Referee: Harry Dale (Cameron A.C.) |
Note: Clark: GK Hunt, LFB Donald, RFB T.Fisher, LHB Lone, CHB Mason, RHB Young(c), LW Neilson, Bowden, CF Fenwick, RW McNeil, C. Fisher. Scottish: GK Myles, LFB Rennie, RFB Laurie(c), RHB Crammond, CHB Ross, LHB Roy, RW W.McMillan, Faulds, CF J.McMillan, LW Colville, Magee.

== American Cup bracket ==
First Round | Second Round
(New Jersey) | Clark A.A. | 1–4
(New Jersey) | Kearny A.C. | 1–1
(New Jersey) | Clark A.A. | 4
(New Jersey) | West Hudson A.A. | 0
(New Jersey) | West Hudson A.A. | 1 (Note: Burns Club Forfeited, West Hudson awarded 1–0 win)
(New York (state)) | Robert Burns Club | 0
Western Circuit
(New Jersey) | Paterson True Blues | 2–3
(New York (state)) | Gordan Rangers | 2–1
(New Jersey) | Paterson True Blues | 8
(New Jersey) | Essex County FC | 2
(New Jersey) | Essex County FC
bye
(New Jersey) | Scottish-Americans | 1
(New Jersey) | Paterson Rangers | 0
(New Jersey) | Scottish-Americans | 5
(New Jersey) | Jersey A.C. | 0
(New Jersey) | Jersey A.C.
bye
Eastern Circuit
(New Jersey) | Newark F.C. | 7
(New Jersey) | St. George United | 0
(New Jersey) | Newark FC | 0–2
(New York (state)) | Hollywood Inn | 0–0
(New York (state)) | Hollywood Inn | 5
(New Jersey) | Hearts | 1

Semifinals
(New Jersey) | Clark A.A. | 1
(New Jersey) | Paterson True Blues | 0
(New Jersey) | Scottish-Americans | 9
(New Jersey) | Newark FC | 2

Finals
(New Jersey) | Clark A.A. | 4
(New Jersey) | Scottish-Americans | 0

Notes;

== See also ==
1906-07 NAFBL
