= 1913 American Amateur Football Association Cup =

1913 AAFA Cup
Tournament details
- Country: United States
- Teams: 24

Final positions
- Champions: Yonkers
- Runner-up: Hollywood Inn

Tournament statistics
- Matches played: 29
- Goals scored: 120 (4.14 per match)

The 1913 AAFA Cup featured twenty-four teams from New York and New Jersey. The 'Wasps' of Yonkers defeated the 'Black and White Brigade' of Hollywood Inn 3–0 to win the tournament. This was the second and final edition as the AAFA Cup. The association became the USFA and awarded the Dewar Trophy for the 1913 edition of the AAFA cup. The Dewar Trophy was also awarded to the National Challenge Cup winners beginning in the 1913–14 season.

== Entries ==
- Anglo-Saxon F.C. – Brooklyn (NYSL D2)
- Brooklyn Celtic F.C. – Brooklyn (NYSL D1)
- Cameron F.C. – New York (NYSL D1)
- Clan McDonald F.C. – Brooklyn (NYSL D1)
- Clan McDuff – New York (NYSL D2)
- Clan McKenzie F.C. – (NYSL D1)
- Columbia Oval – New York (NYSL D2)
- Critchley F.C. – Brooklyn (NYSL D1)
- Eureka F.C. – New York (NYSL D2)
- Fulton F.C. – Woodside (MDL D1)
- German A.C. – New York (NYSL D2)
- Greenpoint Rovers F.C. – Brooklyn (NYSL D2)
- Hibernians – Jersey City (MDL D1)
- Holy Cross – Harrison (Ind.)
- Hollywood Inn F.C. – Yonkers (NYSL D1)
- New York Celtic F.C. – New York (NYSL D1)
- Newark F.C. – Newark (NAFBL)
- St. George – New York (NYSL D1)
- St. George United – New York (NYSL D2)
- Sheffield F.C. – Newark (Ind.)
- Thistle – Bayonne (MDL D2)
- Washington F.C. – Weehawken (NYSL D2)
- White Rose – Astoria (MDL D2)
- Yonkers F.C. – (NYSL D1)

NYSL- New York State Amateur League
MDL- Metropolitan and District Amateur Foot Ball League
NAFBL- National Association Foot Ball League

== First round ==
The first round was played on October 27, 1912. Anglo-Saxon, Clan MacDuff, Critchley, German, Hollywood Inn, New York Celtic, Washington, and White Rose had first round byes.

27 October 1912	Yonkers	3-0	St. George United	Yonkers, NY
3:00PM				Stadium: Nepera Park

27 October 1912	St. George	2-1	Clan McKenzie	Brooklyn, NY
3:00PM	Boyle; Valentine		Sterling	Stadium: Marquette Oval

27 October 1912	Sheffield	3-3	Columbia Oval	Newark, NJ
3:00PM				Stadium: Park View Oval

27 October 1912	Cameron	2-1	Greenpoint Rovers	Brooklyn, NY
3:00PM	S. Bell; W. Isaac		Gray pk'	Stadium: Hawthorne Oval

27 October 1912	Fulton	1-0	Eureka	New York
3:00PM	Baker			Stadium: Eureka Park

27 October 1912	Brooklyn Celtic	1-0	Newark	Newark, NJ
3:00PM	O'Hallaran 20'			Stadium: Morris Park; Attendance: 3,000; Referee: T. Cunningham

27 October 1912	Hibernians	1-1	Holy Cross	Jersey City, NJ
3:00PM	2'		Allen	Stadium: Montgomery Park

27 October 1912	Bayonne Thistle	0-7	Clan MacDonald	Bayonne, NJ
3:00PM

=== replays ===
3 November 1912	Columbia Oval	2-1	Sheffield	New York
	Shankolt		Hudson; Mullins	Stadium: Van Cortlandt Park

3 November 1912	Holy Cross	3-0	Hibernians	Newark, NJ
2:30PM	O'Donnell; O'Donnell; Allen 85'			Stadium: Park View Oval; Referee: Mr. Russell

17 November 1912	St. George	1-0	Clan McKenzie	Brooklyn
3:00PM				Stadium: Marquette Oval

== Bracket ==
Round of 16
November 24 - Morris Park
Yonkers F.C.	6
Holy Cross F.C.	2
November 24 - Astoria
Anglo-Saxon F.C.	5
White Rose F.C.	1
November 24 - Marquette Oval
St. George F.C.	3
New York Celtic	2
November 24 - Columbia Oval
German F.C.	4
Sheffield A.F.C.	2
November 24 - Edison Field
Hollywood Inn F.C.	1
Brooklyn Celtic	0
November 24/December 8 - New York
Clan MacDuff	6 ^{a}
Fulton A.C.	4
November 24 - Marquette Oval
Clan MacDonald	4
Washington F.C.	0
November 24 - Brooklyn
Critchley F.C.	2
Cameron F.C.	1

Quarter-finals
January 5 - Nepera Park
Yonkers F.C.	10
Anglo-Saxon F.C.	2
January 5, 12 - McNulty Field
St. George F.C.	3-5
German F.C.	3-4
January 5 - Dunning Oval
Hollywood Inn F.C.	3
Clan MacDuff	1
January 5 - Marquette Oval
Clan MacDonald	2
Critchley F.C.	0

Semi-finals
March 9 - McNulty Field
Yonkers F.C.	4
St. George F.C.	0
March 23 - Edison Field
Hollywood Inn F.C.	3
Clan MacDonald	1

Final
April 12 - Lenox Oval
Yonkers F.C.	3
Hollywood Inn F.C.	0

a) aggregate after 3 games

== Final ==
12 April 1913
4:00PM

Yonkers F.C.	3–0	Hollywood Inn F.C.
Waldron 25'; King 65'; King 75'

Lenox Oval, New York
Attendance: 2,000
Referee: Mr. Williams (NYSL)

Yonkers F.C.	Hollywood Inn

GK	Raitt
FB	R. Dearns
FB	Stewart
HB	J. Kerr (c)
HB	Hill
HB	Dennison
LW	Billy Waldron
LW	McQueen
C	W. Kydd
RW	Mike King
RW	Whitehouse
Manager:

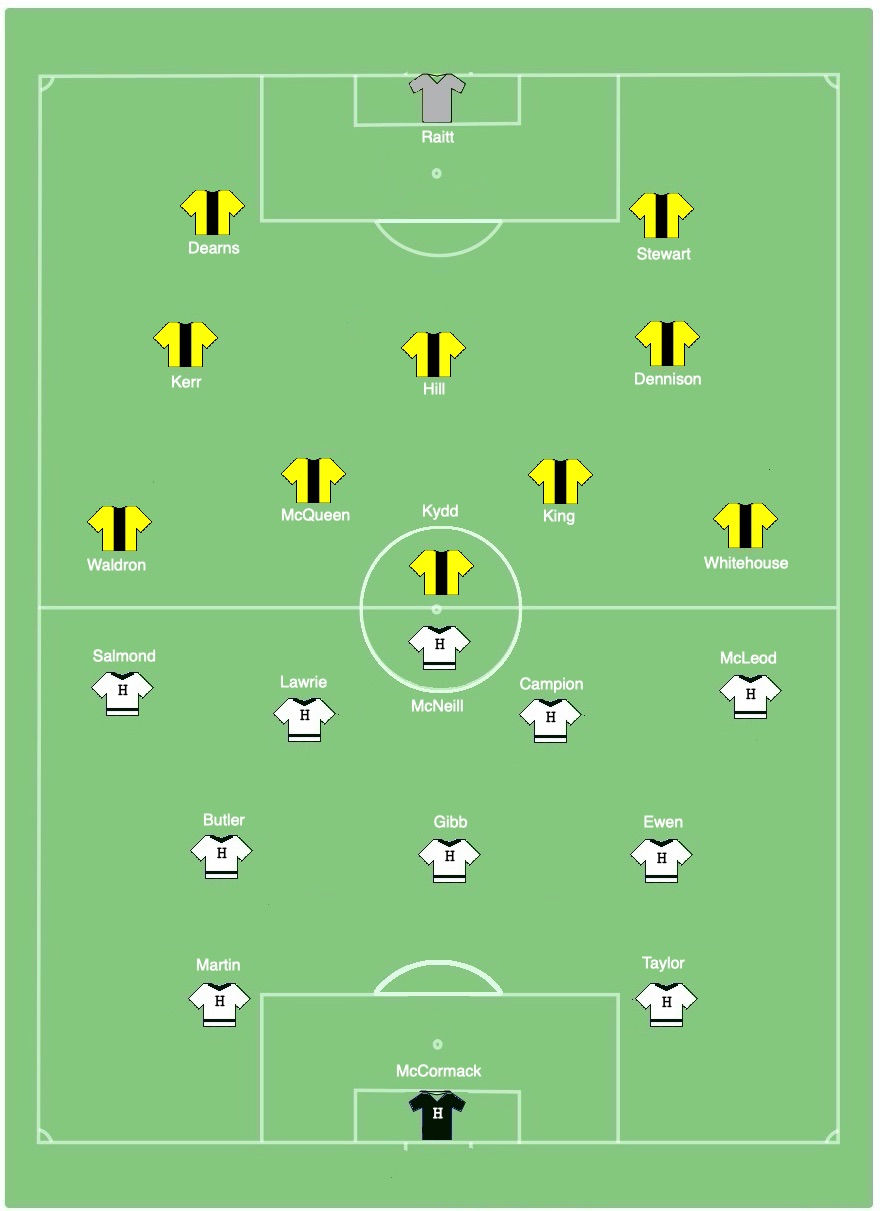

GK	McCormack
FB	Billy Taylor (c)
FB	Martin
HB	Ewen
HB	Gibb
HB	Butler
LW	McLeod
LW	Campion
C	McNeill
RW	Lawrie
RW	Salmond
Manager:
D. Wilkie

Linesmen:
G. Caldicott
C.E. Creighton

Match rules

- 90 minutes
- Replay if game ends in a draw

== See also ==
- 1913 American Cup
