= Charles Drinkwater (soccer) =

American soccer player

Personal information
- Place of birth: Honolulu, Hawaii, United States
- Position: Outside left

Senior career*
Years	Team	Apps	(Gls)
1906	Gordon Rangers		
–1916	Brooklyn Field Club		
1915	→ White Rose F.C. (loan)		
- * Club domestic league appearances and goals

Charles Drinkwater was an American soccer outside left who played for Brooklyn Field Club in the 1914 National Challenge Cup championship game.

In 1906, Drinkwater played for the Gordon Rangers By 1911, he is listed with Brooklyn Field Club in the National Association Football League. On May 16, 1914, Brooklyn defeated Brooklyn Celtic to win the first National Challenge Cup. On February 15, 1915, Drinkwater broke his collarbone while playing on loan with White Rose F.C. in a Metropolitan League game.
