= Matt Diedrichsen =

American soccer player

Mathew B. Diederichsen was an American soccer half back who earned one cap with the U.S. national team in 1916.

When the United States Football Association selected the first national team for a 1916 tour of Scandinavia, Diederichsen was the only player on the team who did not play on the East Coast. Diedrichsen earned one cap with the national team during the tour when he played in the September 3, 1916 tie with Norway.

At the time, Diederichsen played for Innisfails in the St. Louis Soccer League.
