= Walter Dick =

American soccer player (1905–1989)

Personal information
- Date of birth: September 20, 1905
- Place of birth: Kirkintilloch, Scotland
- Date of death: July 24, 1989 (aged 83)
- Place of death: Lafayette, California, U.S.
- Position: Inside forward

Senior career*
Years	Team	Apps	(Gls)
1922–1923	Armadale		
1923–1924	Niagara Falls Rangers		
1924–1928	Providence	77	(10)
1928–1931	→ Providence Gold Bugs	72	(11)
1931–1937	→ Fall River	14	(0)
1937–????	Pawtucket Rangers	20	(1)
- Kearny Scots-Americans

International career
1934	United States	1	(0)
- * Club domestic league appearances and goals

Walter Dick (September 20, 1905 – July 24, 1989) was a soccer player who played as a forward. Born in Scotland, he was a member of the U.S. national team at the 1934 FIFA World Cup. He is a member of the U.S. National Soccer Hall of Fame.

== Professional career ==
Dick began his professional career with Armadale F.C. in the Scottish Football League. In 1923, at the age of seventeen, he moved to the United States, settling in Niagara Falls, New York. When he arrived, he immediately began playing with the Niagara Falls Rangers. The manager of Providence of the American Soccer League spotted Dick playing for Rangers and offered him a contract. Dick went on to play six seasons with Providence between 1924 and 1930. However, in 1928, the team changed its name to the Providence Gold Bugs. By 1930, the ravages of the Great Depression and the "Soccer Wars" had begun to take their toll on the ASL and teams began to fold, move and merge. In 1930, a group of businessmen led by Harold Brittan bought the team, and moved the team to Fall River, Massachusetts, where it spent most of the 1930–1931 ASL season as Fall River When Fall River merged with the New Bedford Whalers during the spring of 1931, Dick moved to the Pawtucket Rangers. The Rangers left the ASL in the fall of 1932 as the league began to collapse, but joined the newly formed second American Soccer League in the fall of 1933. In 1934 and 1935, the Rangers went to the National Challenge Cup, only to fall to Stix, Baer and Fuller F.C. in 1934 and the same team, only renamed St. Louis Central Breweries F.C. in 1935. In 1937, he joined the Kearny Scots-Americans and remained with the team through the 1941 season. During that span, Kearny won five league championships.

== National team ==
In 1934, Dick earned one cap with the U.S. national team at the 1934 FIFA World Cup. In that game, the U.S. lost to Italy in the first round of the cup.

Dick was inducted into the New England Soccer Hall of Fame in 1985 and the National Soccer Hall of Fame in 1989.

== See also ==
- List of United States men's international soccer players born outside the United States
