= Howard and Bullough F.C. =

Former soccer team from Rhode Island, U.S.

The Howard and Bullough Football Club (also known as Howard & Bullough) was an early twentieth century U.S. soccer team which was based out of Pawtucket, Rhode Island. It won the 1911 American Cup.

== History ==
The team began play in late 1899. In 1903 they joined the Amateur Shop Association Football League. By 1912 the team had won the New England cup tie competition four times, the Rhode Island cup three times and the American cup once. They went to the semifinals of the American Cup in 1908. In October 1909, the Howard and Bullough were part of the newly formed Eastern Soccer League. The collapsed with less than half of its games played. At that time, Howard and Bullough was in second place with a 3–1–1 record. Howard and Bullough took the AFA title in 1911 when they defeated the Philadelphia Hibernian in the 1911 American Cup final. The teams played to a 1–1 tie, but Howard and Bullough took the replay, 3-1. In 1915, the team joined the Southern New England Soccer League (SNESL). The league did not complete its season. Howard and Bullough finished fourth in the 1916-1917 season, then withdrew from the league.

== Year-by-year ==
Year	League	Reg. season	American Cup	National Challenge Cup
1907/08	?	?	Third Round	N/A
1908/09	?	?	Third Round	N/A
1909/10	ESL	2nd	First round	N/A
1910/11	?	?	Champion	N/A
1911/12	?	?	Semifinals	N/A
1912/13	?	?	Second Round	N/A
1913/14	?	?	Did not enter	Did not enter
1914/15	?	?	?	?
1915/16	SNESL	?	?	First round
1916/17	SNESL	4th	?	Quarterfinals

== Honors ==
American Cup

- Winner (1): 1911

League Championship

- Runner Up (1): 1910
