= Frank Mather (footballer) =

English footballer

Personal information
- Place of birth: England
- Position: Goalkeeper

Senior career*
| Years | Team | Apps | (Gls) |
- Brooklyn Celtic
| 1915 | New York Continentals | | |
| 1915–1916 | Brooklyn Celtic | | |
- * Club domestic league appearances and goals

Frank Mather was an English association football goalkeeper who played in the first two American National Challenge Cups. He played sporadically for Brooklyn Celtic.

Mather played for the Derby County reserves which won the 1909-1910 Derbyshire Cup. By 1913, he was playing for Brooklyn Celtic in the New York State Association Football League. In 1914, Celtic lost to the Brooklyn Field Club in the first National Challenge Cup. He did not play again until January 1915 when he joined the New York Continentals. By May 1915, he was back with Celtic when they went to the final of the Challenge Cup, losing this time to Bethlehem Steel. He again took time off from the game, rejoining Celtic in February 1916.
