= Hyde Park Blues =

Hyde Park Blues was an early twentieth century U.S. soccer team. Hyde Park Blues were an ethnically British team which played in the Association Football League of Chicago (AFLC) before moving to the Chicago Soccer League.

== History ==
In 1904, Hyde Park Blues were an inaugural member of the newly-established AFLC, winning their first match 6–4 against the Wanderers.

They won the spring season, edging out Pullman F.C. In the fall 1904 season, they finished 9-0-1, taking the league title for a second consecutive time. They had their greatest success between 1910 and 1913. During those years, they won two league championships, one Peel Cup and one league cup (Jackson Cup). They finished at the bottom of the standings in 1915-1916 and disappeared from view.

== Year-by-year ==
Year	League	Reg. season	Peel Cup	National Challenge Cup
Spring 1904	CAFBL	1st	N/A	N/A
Fall 1904	CAFBL	1st	N/A	N/A
1907	CAFBL	2nd	N/A	N/A
1909/10	AFA	3rd	Champion	N/A
1910/11	AFA	1st	?	N/A
1911/12	AFA	3rd	?	N/A
1912/13	AFA	1st	Runner up	N/A
1913/14	AFA	3rd	?	Third round
1914/15	AFA	7th	?	First round
1915/16	CSL	7th	?	?

== Honors ==
Peel Cup

- Winner (1): 1911
- Runner Up (1): 1913

Jackson Cup

- Winner (1): 1911

League Championship

- Winner (2): 1911, 1913
