= 1913–14 National Association Foot Ball League season =

National Association Foot Ball League
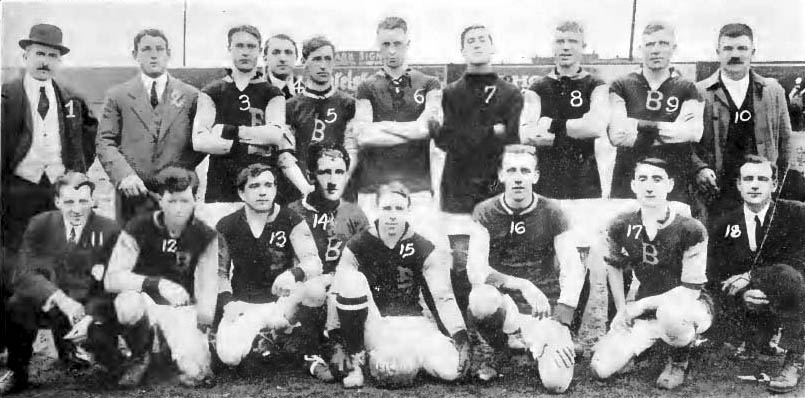
- Brooklyn Field, Champions
- Season: 1913–14
- Champion(s): Brooklyn F.C. (1st title)
- Matches: 77

Statistics of National Association Foot Ball League in season 1913–14.

Before the season, St. George was added, and New York Clan MacDonald rejoined the league. Paterson Wilberforce withdrew in January. After the season, St. George withdrew.

== League standings ==
| Position | Team | Pts | Pld | W | L | T |
|---|---|---|---|---|---|---|
| 1 | Brooklyn F.C. | 26 | 14 | 12 | 0 | 2 |
| 2 | West Hudson A.A. | 25 | 16 | 11 | 2 | 3 |
| 3 | New York Clan MacDonald | 20 | 16 | 9 | 5 | 2 |
| 4 | Newark F.C. | 15 | 15 | 5 | 5 | 5 |
| 5 | Paterson Rangers | 14 | 14 | 5 | 5 | 4 |
| 6 | Jersey A.C. | 11 | 10 | 3 | 2 | 5 |
| 7 | Kearny Scots | 9 | 11 | 3 | 5 | 3 |
| 8 | Paterson True Blues | 8 | 8 | 3 | 3 | 2 |
| 9 | Newark Caledonians | 5 | 13 | 1 | 9 | 3 |
| 10 | Bronx United | 5 | 12 | 2 | 9 | 1 |
| 11 | St.George F.C. | 3 | 13 | 1 | 11 | 1 |
| 12 | Paterson Wilberforce | 5 | 11 | 2 | 8 | 1 |
