= 1907–08 National Association Foot Ball League season =

National Association Foot Ball League
- Season: 1907–08
- Champion(s): Newark F.C. (1st title)
- Matches: 45

Statistics of National Association Foot Ball League in season 1907–08.

Before the season, Bayonne Jersey F.C., New York and Yonkers were added. West Hudson and East Newark did not play this season. After the season, Bayonne, New York, Yonkers and Newark Hearts withdrew.

== League standings ==
Position	Team	Pts	Pld	W	L	T
1	Newark F.C.	20	13	9	2	2
2	Paterson Rangers	19	14	9	3	1
3	Kearny Scots	13	13	6	6	1
4	Paterson True Blues	11	8	4	1	3
5	New York Clan MacDonald	7	9	3	5	1
T6	Hollywood Inn F.C.	7	9	3	5	1
T6	Bayonne Jersey F.C.	4	11	1	8	2
8	Newark Hearts	3	13	1	7	1
