= Hollywood Inn F.C. =

U.S. soccer team

Hollywood Inn F.C. was a U.S. soccer team which played in Yonkers, New York during the early twentieth century. While an amateur team for much of its existence, it played a single season in the professional National Association Football League. In 1913, it went to the final of the American Amateur Football Association Cup where it lost to Yonkers F.C.

== History ==
The team was organized in the summer of 1901 and played its first game in September of that year. In October 1902, Hollywood Inn F.C. played the Union Settlement Athletic Club as part of the Greater New York Irish Athletic Association games. In 1904 Hollywood Inn joined the recently established Metropolitan Association Football League (MAFL), going to the league cup final in 1905. After three seasons in the MAFL, Hollywood Inn moved to the National Association Football League. The team finished second from the bottom of the standings and moved back the amateur leagues the next season. In 1908, they joined the New York State Football Association, also known as the New York Amateur League. This league had two distinct divisions, one which played on Saturday and the other on Sunday. Hollywood Inn won the Saturday League then defeated New York Clan MacDonald of the Sunday League in the champion game. They also finished runner up to Brooklyn F.C. in the league cup. In 1911, the New York Amateur League adopted the unwieldy title, the New York and District Amateur Association Foot Ball League (NYDAAFBL) but returned to its original name the next season. Hollywood Inn finished a lowly eighth in the league standings for the 1911-1912 season, but made up for it when it went to the semifinals of the newly established American Amateur Football Association Cup. The AAFA would soon evolve into the United States Football Association and gain entry into FIFA in 1913. However, in the summer of 1913, AAFA held one more Cup. This year, Hollywood Inn went to the finals where it fell to Yonkers F.C. When the AAFA became the USFA, it ended its cup and introduced the National Challenge Cup, which later became the U.S. Open Cup. In 1914, Hollywood Inn lost in the second round of the inaugural cup. There is no mention of the team after 1915.

== Year-by-year ==
Year	League	Record	Reg. season	American Cup	National Challenge Cup
1904/05	MAFL	?	?	?	N/A
1905/06	MAFL	?	?	?	N/A
1906/07	MAFL	?	?	Semifinals	N/A
1907/08	NAFBL	3-5-1	7th	Second Round	N/A
1908/09	NYAL	?	1st	Second round	N/A
1909/10	NYAL	?	?	First round	N/A
1910/11	NYAL	8-3-3	3rd	First Round	N/A
1911/12	NYAL	7-13-0	8th	First Round	N/A
1912/13	NYAL	8-7-3	4th	Did not enter	N/A
1913/14	NYAL	5-8-3	6th	Preliminary Round	Second round
1914/15	NYAL	5-12-1	9th	First round	?

== Honors ==
League Championship

- Winner (1): 1909

American Amateur Football Association Cup

- Runner Up (1): 1913

Metropolitan Association Football League Cup

- Runner Up (2): 1905

New York State Association Cup

- Winner (1): 1910, Runner Up (2): 1909
