= Niagara Falls Rangers =

The Niagara Falls Rangers were an amateur U.S. soccer team based out of Niagara Falls, New York. The club was founded by the Lyall brothers in 1909, and joined the Buffalo and District Soccer League when that formed in 1910. They competed in the Independent Foot Ball League where they finished second in 1912 to city rivals the Wanderers. In 1914, they advanced to the semifinals of the National Challenge Cup, losing to Brooklyn Celtic by a 6-2 score. In 1922, National Soccer Hall of Fame player Walter Dick began his career with them.
