= Newark FC (United States) =

Football club from the USA

Newark F.C.
- Full name: Newark Football Club
- Founded: 1906
- Stadium: Morris Park
- League: NAFBL
Home colors

Newark Football Club was an early twentieth century U.S. soccer team which played in several leagues including the National Association Football League and Eastern Soccer League.

== History ==
In 1906, Newark F.C. entered the professional National Association Football League. Finishing a respectable fourth, they jumped to the top of the standings during the 1907-1908 season. In 1909, Newark began the season in the NAFBL, but withdrew during the season. At the same time, it took part in the failed first Eastern Soccer League (ESL). The ESL was created as a “super league” of top east coast teams who would compete both in the ESL and their home leagues. The ESL completed less than half of the scheduled games before collapsing. At the time, Newark was at the bottom of the standings with an 0-4-1 record. Newark returned to the NAFBL, but withdrew at the end of the season to join the New York and District Amateur Association Football League (NYDAAFBL). Newark won the league, but jumped back to the NAFBL during the 1912-1913 season. The Brooklyn Wanderers has begun the season, but withdrew after six games. Newark took their place and finished ninth having played only thirteen games (3-8-2 record). They rebounded the next season, finishing fourth, but dropped the next season to eighth. This time they withdrew from the NAFBL and never returned. While their league play was below par, they did go to the final of the American Amateur Football Association Cup.

== Year-by-year ==
Year	League	Reg. season	American Cup
1906/07	NAFBL	4th	Semifinals
1907/08	NAFBL	1st	Third Round
1908/09	NAFBL	3rd	Third round
1909/10	NAFBL	Withdrew	First Round
1909/10	EPSL	6th	First Round
1910/11	NAFBL	5th	First Round
1911/12	NYDAAFBL	1st	Did not enter
1912/13	NAFBL	9th	Did not enter
1913/14	NAFBL	4th	First Round

== Honors ==
American Amateur Football Association Cup

- Runner Up (1): 1912

League Championship

- Winner (2): 1908, 1912
