= St. Leo's (soccer team) =

St. Leo’s was a U.S. soccer team based in St. Louis, Missouri. It was founded in 1903 as a member of the St. Louis Association Football League before moving to the St. Louis Soccer League in 1908. It was one of the first fully professional soccer teams in the U.S. and dominated the St. Louis soccer scene for over a decade. In 1918, the team came under sponsorship of St. Louis Screw and competed under that name until 1922.

== History ==
Nicknamed the Blue and White, St. Leo’s was founded by William Klosterman in 1902 as a recreational team for the St. Leo’s Sodality, a Catholic men’s organization. It competed in the Junior League, winning the league title. In 1903, St. Leo's moved up to the Amateur League which competed at Christian Brother's College where they again won the league title. During the 1904-05 season, they competed in a league at Forest Park, in 1905-06, they entered the Empire Park League and in 1906-08 the St. Louis Association Foot Ball League winning the championship in each of those seasons. Following its 1908 championship, the AFL merged with the St. Louis Soccer League which had been established the year before. St. Leo’s quickly asserted its dominance as the only fully professional team in the new league. It ran off a string of five championships. By 1910, frustrations at St. Leo’s success began to surface among the league’s other teams. This led to a movement to make the SLSL and entirely amateur league. This controversy became so heated during the 1911-1912 season that St. Leo’s withdrew from the league during the end of the season. Despite not playing several games, it still won the league title. The team re-entered the SLSL for the 1912-1913 season, but the resentment at its success could no longer be contained and the SLSL split in 1913 into two leagues, the Athletic Park League and the Pastime Park League. St. Leo’s took both Federal Park League titles, but in 1915, Innisfails defeated St. Leo's for the city championship. The first game of the three game series ended in a 2-2 tie with Innisfails taking the second game, 4-2. The third game never materialized because of conflicting events and unavailability of players. That summer, the two leagues merged to form a renewed SLSL. This episode did not serve St. Leo’s long term interests as it brought Ben Millers into the top level of St. Louis soccer. Ben Millers quickly established themselves as the dominant team and St. Leo’s and Innisfails found themselves fighting for second place. In 1918, St. Leo’s Catholic Church withdrew its sponsorship from the team and the team gained the sponsorship of St. Louis Screws. St. Leo's had a Municipal League team entered in the 1922 National Challenge Cup.

== Intercity matches ==
In December 1911 the St. Leos hosted the 1911 American Cup holders Tacony of Philadelphia and played them to a 4-4 tie. On December 29, 1912, St. Leo’s defeated the 1912 American Cup holders West Hudson A.A. 4-2.

== Record ==
Year	League	Record	Position
1903-1904	AFL		
1904-1905	AFL		
1905-1906	AFL		Champion
1906-1907	AFL		Champion
1907-1908	AFL	11-0-2	Champion
1908-1909	SLSL	12-2-4	Champion
1909-1910	SLSL	6-1-8	Champion
1910-1911	SLSL	10-4-3	Champion
1911-1912	SLSL	11-2-2	Champion
1912-1913	SLSL	7-2-1	Champion
1913-1914	Federal Park	11-0-2	Champion
1914-1915	Federal Park	10-1-2	Champion
1915-1916	SLSL	4-8-7	4th
1916-1917	SLSL	8-8-4	3rd
1917-1918	SLSL	7-4-6	2nd

== 1910 roster ==
- Outside right: Jimmy Donohue
- Inside right: William Tallman
- Center forward: Chuck O'Berta, Richard "Bull" Brannigan
- Inside left: J. Arthur "Butch" Amnions, Joe Mason
- Outside left: Dave Miller
- Right half: Joe Flynn
- Center half: Gerald Shea, Peterson,
- Left half: Johnny Miller
- Right full: Medric Boucher, Hick January
- Left full: James "Jim" Flynn
- Goalkeeper: Jack Tully

== Coach ==
- William Klosterman 1902-
