= Innisfails =

Innisfails was a U.S. soccer team which competed in the St. Louis Soccer League from 1907 to 1921.

== History ==
Innisfails was a charter member of the newly founded St. Louis Soccer League in 1907. The SLSL was created as a rival to the city’s Association Football League which was established in 1903. Innisfails won the first title, but following the merger of the SLSL and AFL in 1908, Innisfails dropped out and St. Leo's moved into its place in the league. In 1909, Innisfails returned to the SLSL. While they had left as champions, their first year back proved much less successful as they finished fourth out of four teams with a 3-10-2 record. They improved their finish each of the next two seasons, rising to second by the end of the 1911-1912 season when they finished behind St. Leo’s. They finished second again the next year, but in 1913, disagreements about professionalism led the league to split into the Federal Park and Robison Field Leagues. Innisfails joined the Robison Field League which was an amateur league. While St. Leo’s, their nemesis for the previous two SLSL seasons, were now in the Federal Park League, Innisfails was still unable to top the standings, finishing second to the Columbus Club in 1913-1914. In addition to its league games, Innisfails also went on exhibition tours against other top U.S. team. In 1913, Innisfails traveled east for five games against Paterson True Blues. They finished 0-4-1 against the Blues. The next year saw them win their first league title since 1908, as they took first in the Robison Field League. By 1915, the two leagues were looking to merge. As part of this process, the top teams from each league played for the St. Louis city championship. As the Robison Field League champion, Innisfails played St. Leo’s, the Federal Park League champion. Innisfails finally topped their longtime rivals to win the combined league championship. Soon after the two leagues merged to reform the St. Louis Soccer League. This merger brought Ben Millers into the league and both Innisfails and St. Leo’s found themselves battling for second behind the new team. In 1920, Innisfails lost to eventual champion Ben Millers in the second round of the National Challenge Cup. By 1920, Innisfails had begun to fade and after finishing fourth, withdrew from the league in 1921.

In 1916, the U.S. national team played its first official games. Matt Diedrichsen of Innisfails was the only player outside of the northeast U.S. called into the team for its tour of Scandinavia.

== Record ==
Year	Record	League	Open Cup
1907–1908	9-2-6	Champion	N/A
1908–1909	*		N/A
1909–1910	3-10-2	4th	N/A
1910–1911	7-9-1	3rd	N/A
1911–1912	8-4-3	2nd	N/A
1912–1913	6-3-2	2nd	N/A
1913–1914	9-6-5	2nd	Did not enter
1914–1915	10-2-2	Champion	Did not enter
1915–1916	7-6-6	2nd	Did not enter
1916–1917	9-8-3	2nd	Did not enter
1917–1918	5-6-6	3rd	
1918–1919	9-8-4	2nd	
1919–1920	10-8-3	2nd	Second Round
1920–1921	6-9-7	4th	Third Round

- Sat out this season.
