= Yonkers F.C. =

Yonkers Football Club was an early twentieth century amateur U.S. soccer team. During its short time in existence, it won several cup competitions, including the 1913 American Amateur Football Association Cup.

== History ==
Based in Yonkers, New York, Yonkers F.C. entered the New York State Amateur Football League (NYSAFL) in 1911. It would play in this league until 1915 and lose in the first round of the American Cup that fall. Outside of this brief period, nothing is known of the team. However, during these four seasons, it was one of the top amateur teams in the U.S. Their best season in the NYSAFL came in 1913-1914 when they finished second to Brooklyn Celtic by two points. Yonkers went 14-1-1, losing only to the champions. Yonkers greatest successes came in cup competitions. In 1913, it won the second American Amateur Football Association Cup, defeating Hollywood Inn F.C. 3–0. Between 1913 and 1915, Yonkers also went to three consecutive Southern New York State Football Association Cups, winning once and finishing runner up twice.

== Year-by-year ==
Year	League	Reg. season	American Cup	National Challenge Cup
1911/12	NYSAFL	4th	?	N/A
1912/13	NYSAFL	5th	?	N/A
1913/14	NYSAFL	2nd	?	Fourth round
1914/15	NYSAFL	3rd	?	First round
1914/15	?	?	First round	?

== Honors ==
League Championship

- Runner Up (1): 1914

American Amateur Football Association Cup

- Winner (1): 1913

Southern New York State Football Association Cup

- Winner (1): 1913
- Runner up (2): 1914, 1915

Gooch Invitation Cup

- Winner (1): 1913
