= Brooklyn Field Club =

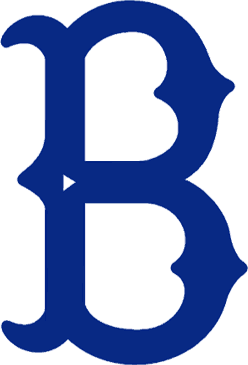
- Full name: Brooklyn Field Club
- Short name: Brooklyn F.C.
- Founded: 1898
- Dissolved: 1924
- Stadium: Brooklyn, NY
- League: American Soccer League
Home colors

Brooklyn Field Club was a soccer team based in Brooklyn, New York, that existed from 1898 to 1924. It is one of the few to predate the United States Soccer Federation, which was founded in 1913.

== Overview ==
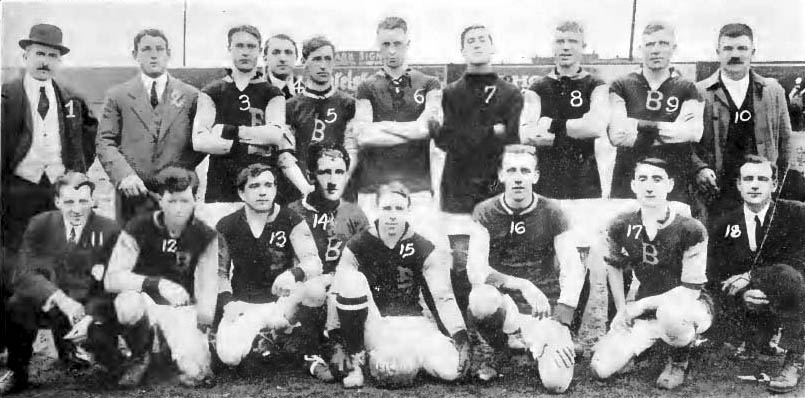
Brooklyn Field, 1913–14 champions

Between 1909 and 1916 they played in the second National Association Football League (NAFBL), winning the 1913–1914 title.

The team was the first to win the National Challenge Cup, the earliest version of what was to be known from 1999 as the Lamar Hunt U.S. Open Cup in 1914 defeating Brooklyn Celtic in the final 2–1.

== Honors ==
- National Association Foot Ball League
  - Winner (1): 1913–14
- National Challenge Cup
  - Winner (1): 1913–14
