= Eppley =

Eppley is a surname. Notable people with the surname include:

- Cody Eppley (born 1985), American professional baseball pitcher
- Eugene C. Eppley, (1884–1958), hotel magnate in Omaha, Nebraska
- Geary Eppley (1895–1978), American university administrator, professor, agronomist, military officer, athlete, and track and field coach
- Marion Eppley (1883–1960), American physical chemist
- Richard Eppley (1931–2023), American oceanographer

== See also ==
- Eppley Foundation, founded in Omaha, Nebraska
- Eugene C. Eppley College of Business Administration at Creighton University in Omaha, Nebraska
- Eppley Airfield, a medium hub airport three miles northeast of Omaha, Nebraska
- Eugene C. Eppley Administration Building, located on the University of Nebraska in Omaha, Nebraska
- Eugene C. Eppley Fine Arts Building, located on the Morningside College campus in Sioux City, Iowa
- Eugene C. Eppley Center, located on the Michigan State University campus in East Lansing, Michigan
- Eppley Hotel Company, located in Omaha, Nebraska
- Eppley Institute for Research in Cancer and Allied Diseases at the University of Nebraska Medical Center in Omaha, Nebraska
- Eppleby
- Epley maneuver
