= Eppley Foundation =

Philanthropic foundation in Omaha, Nebraska

Eugene C. Eppley Foundation
- Founder: Eugene C. Eppley
- Purpose: Education, Healthcare, Civic improvement
- Region served: Midwest
- Method: Donations

The Eugene C. Eppley Foundation was founded in Omaha, Nebraska. Founded by Omaha hotel magnate Eugene C. Eppley, the foundation was the leading benefactor for several charities and institutions in the Midwestern United States. (This is not to be confused with the Eppley Foundation for Research, which primarily supports advanced postdoctoral research in the physical and biological sciences. The latter was founded by Marion Eppley, and its offices are based in New York City.)

== About ==
Beginning in 1949, the Eppley Foundation contributed to a variety of educational, healthcare and civic endeavors. Eppley was a longtime friend of Dr. Milo Bail, the president of the Omaha University from 1948 until 1965. During that time the Eppley Foundation gave more than $1.2 million to the university. After Eppley's passing, the Eppley Foundation donated another $50,000 to recruit distinguished professors. The Eppley Library (now the Administration building) at the University of Nebraska at Omaha was named in recognition of the Foundation's giving.

In the 1950s, the foundation donated a substantial amount of the costs to build the Gene Eppley Boys Club located on North 24th Street in North Omaha. In 1960 the foundation donated $1 million to the city to renovate Omaha Municipal Airport to accommodate jet aircraft in order to better connect Omaha to the rest of the nation. It was renamed Eppley Airfield in his honor.

In the 1970s the foundation funded Eppley Fellowships at the Smithsonian Institution for research in a variety of issues. The Eugene C. Eppley Institute for Research in Cancer and Allied Diseases was dedicated in 1963 at the University of Nebraska College of Medicine with a $2,500,000 grant from the Eppley Foundation. In 1967 the Eppley Foundation gave $2,250,000 to the City of Omaha and Douglas County to build a new city-county office building in downtown.

== Record donations ==
The Eppley Foundation led the way for giving to a number of educational institutions in the Midwest. Outside of the namesake family, it was the leading benefactor of the Culver Academies in Indiana, where Eppley had studied. It was also the largest donor ever to the University of Nebraska at Omaha.

== Honorary naming ==
Properties currently or formerly named after Eugene C. Eppley because of donations by his foundation include:

- Eppley Airfield in Omaha
- Eugene C. Eppley Administration Building (formerly Library) at the University of Nebraska at Omaha
- Eppley Institute for Research in Cancer and Allied Diseases at the University of Nebraska Medical Center, Omaha
- Eugene C. Eppley College of Business Administration at Creighton University
- Eugene C. Eppley Recreation Center at the Omaha School for Boys
- Gene Eppley Camp, a Salvation Army camp in Bellevue, Nebraska
- Eugene C. Eppley Pachyderm Hill at the Henry Doorly Zoo in Omaha
- Eugene C. Eppley Auditorium and the Eppley Club at Culver Academies in Culver, Indiana
- Eugene C. Eppley Fine Arts Building at Morningside College, Sioux City, Iowa
- Eugene C. Eppley Center at Michigan State University, home of The School of Hospitality Business as well as other units within the Eli Broad College of Business

== See also ==
- History of Omaha
