= Epley =

Epley may refer to:

== People with the surname ==
- David Epley (1931–2009), minister who broadcast his weekly Christian TV show across the United States
- Karen Sparks Epley (born 1955), American accountant
- Rebecca Epley, contestant in America's Next Top Model (season 4) aired in spring 2005

== Places ==
- Epley, Kentucky, an unincorporated community in Logan County, Kentucky, United States

== See also ==
- Epley maneuver, used to treat benign paroxysmal positional vertigo (BPPV) of the posterior or anterior canals
- Dr. Frank W. Epley Office, house located in New Richmond, Wisconsin and on the National Register of Historic Places
- Eple
- Epperley
- Eppley
