= Eugene C. Eppley =

American hotelier (1884–1958)

- Born: April 8, 1884; Akron, Ohio
- Died: October 14, 1958 (aged 74); Omaha, Nebraska
- Education: Culver Military Academy
- Occupation: Hotelier
- Known for: Businessman, philanthropist

Eugene C. Eppley (April 8, 1884 – October 14, 1958), also known as Gene, was a hotel magnate in Omaha, Nebraska. Eppley is credited with single-handedly building one of the most successful hotel empires, by the 1950s the largest privately owned hotel chain in the United States.

== Early life and career ==
Eugene Chase Eppley, the only child of Owen and Jessie Eppley, was descended from inn-keepers. His ancestors, of German descent, settled in Pennsylvania in the early eighteenth century. Eppley's Tavern in Philadelphia hosted such prominent patrons as George Washington and Benjamin Franklin. Eugene was born at the family's Empire House Hotel in Akron, Ohio, on April 8, 1884. As a teenager, Eppley was active in athletics, and journeyed with a friend by bicycle from Akron to Niagara Falls, New York City, and Philadelphia. At age 15 in 1899, he enrolled at the Culver Military Academy in northern Indiana, and graduated two years later, the second in his class of 36 cadets.

Eschewing a college education, Eppley entered the hotel business on the ground level as a maintenance worker at Hotel William McKinley in Canton, Ohio. By age 20 he had risen to the position of steward, equivalent to assistant manager. He was hired away as manager of the Alsace Hotel in Franklin, Pennsylvania, which he renamed the Park Hotel. Two and a half years later he became joint lessee and manager of the Hotel Rider, a large resort at Cambridge Springs, Pennsylvania. Eighteen months after that, Eppley became general manager of the 400-room West Hotel in Minneapolis. His success came to the attention of Midwest hotelier Frank G. Warden. Over a period of nine years they acquired another half dozen hotels before amicably splitting in 1917.

== Career expansion ==
With ownership of seven properties, the Eppley Hotel Company was formed in 1917, its headquarters at the Hotel Martin in Sioux City, Iowa. Eppley's success was renowned. Before he was 30 years old, he was elected president of the Hotel Men's Mutual Benefit Association of the United States and Canada, said to be the largest organization of its kind in the world. In 1921 Eppley acquired the leasehold interest in the Hotel Fontenelle in Omaha, Nebraska. The Fontenelle was regarded as one of the most important hotels between Chicago and the West Coast. It became the company's flagship headquarters. Eppley took up residence at the Fontenelle and lived there the rest of his life.

By the mid-1950s, Eppley had built his company into the largest individually-controlled hotel system in the world at that time. At its peak the Eppley Hotel Company owned 22 hotels in six states. Eppley sold the company to Sheraton Hotels in 1956 for $30 million (equivalent to $355 million in 2025).

Eppley was also a Sheraton director, a substantial stockholder in the Statler Hotel chain, and a director of Braniff International Airways.

== Personal life and death ==
Eppley was a lifelong bachelor. As a young man, he took an intense interest in aviation. In 1911, he was billed in the Ohio county fair circuit as "Daredevil Eppley who chills the crowd with the thrills of his air antics." Other hobbies included golf and horseback riding. He was active in Omaha's civic and social organization Knights of Ak-Sar-Ben, which supported local philanthropy. He was awarded its highest honor, elected the King of the Court of Ak-Sar-Ben, in 1932.

As an art enthusiast, Eppley personally commissioned paintings by artist Grant Wood. He commissioned the well-known "Fruits of Iowa" grouping in 1932, for murals for four of his hotels in Midwestern cities. Several of the paintings of this series are now housed at Coe College in Iowa.

Eppley died in his suite at the Sheraton-Fontenelle on October 14, 1958. He had been ill for about two years, and had suffered a stroke sometime before his death. The Omaha World-Herald editorialized that the "veteran hotel man was a lonely individual. He had no family and while for many years he led an active social life, he had few intimates." Nevertheless, it concluded that Omahans "will remember him as a generous man who tried to ease the lot of the poor, and who gave a great deal of his wealth to education." His biographer summed up:

"He fought hard and held his own... and success was prompted by the love of the game. He was acquisitive and altruistic, proud and modest, but beneath it all humble and compassionate. His life seemed a struggle to keep his soft side from showing. He taught and inspired and disciplined... but exacted more of himself than any other. He was an organizer, leader, teacher, fighter, talker and giver. All of his facets added up to a rather heroic figure."

== Philanthropy ==
Eppley was a renowned philanthropist, who gave primarily to educational, civic and medical research causes in the Midwestern United States and especially in Omaha.

In an unusual event, in 1955 Eppley through his hotel company donated food to the nuclear test experiment conducted with civilian witnesses, known as Operation Cue. His and other private efforts were meant to demonstrate the ability of companies to ship and distribute food for "survivors" of a nuclear blast. Many witnesses were involved with civil defense organizations.

== The Eppley estate ==
The bulk of Eppley's assets were conveyed to the Eugene C. Eppley Foundation prior to his death, to sustain his philanthropic giving. His will left bequests of nearly $2 million (equivalent to $22 million in 2025) to 79 persons, many of them former employees or associates. For example, Lloyd N. Prince, whom Eppley hired in 1921 as a publicity man, remained with the company for 37 years; he received $150,000. Sheraton-Fontenelle porter Arthur J. Carter, who knew Eppley for 50 years when the latter was chief steward at the McKinley Hotel in Canton, Ohio, received $13,000. Other beneficiaries included bookkeepers, telephone operators, printers, a waitress, a laundry manager, secretaries, a carpenter, and a catering secretary.

== Honors and memorials ==
Properties currently or formerly named after Eugene C. Eppley because of donations by his foundation include:

- Eppley Airfield in Omaha
- Eugene C. Eppley Administration Building (formerly Library) at the University of Nebraska at Omaha
- Eppley Institute for Research in Cancer and Allied Diseases at the University of Nebraska Medical Center, Omaha
- Eugene C. Eppley College of Business Administration at Creighton University
- Eugene C. Eppley Recreation Center at the Omaha School for Boys
- Gene Eppley Camp, a Salvation Army camp in Bellevue, Nebraska
- Eugene C. Eppley Pachyderm Hill at the Henry Doorly Zoo in Omaha
- Eugene C. Eppley Auditorium and the Eppley Club at Culver Academies in Culver, Indiana
- Eugene C. Eppley Fine Arts Building at Morningside College, Sioux City, Iowa
- Eugene C. Eppley Center at Michigan State University, home of The School of Hospitality Business as well as other units within the Eli Broad College of Business

== See also ==
- History of Omaha
