= Mellon Green =

Urban park in Downtown Pittsburgh, USA

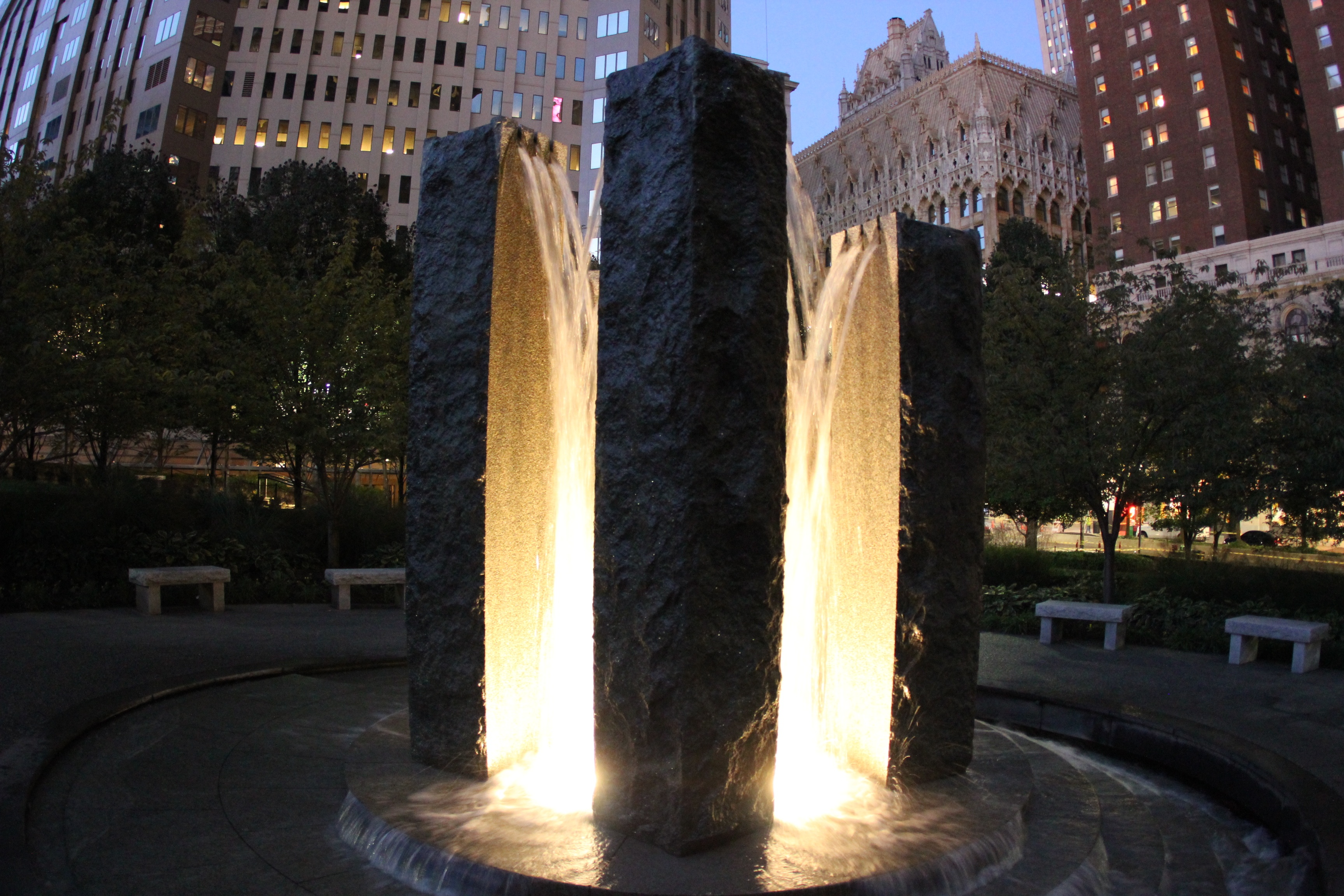
- Interactive map of Mellon Green
- Type: Privately owned "Public Space" Park
- Location: Pittsburgh, Pennsylvania
- Coordinates: 40.440287°N 79.995316°W
- Area: 1-acre (4,000 m^{2})
- Created: 1984
- Operator: Mellon Financial

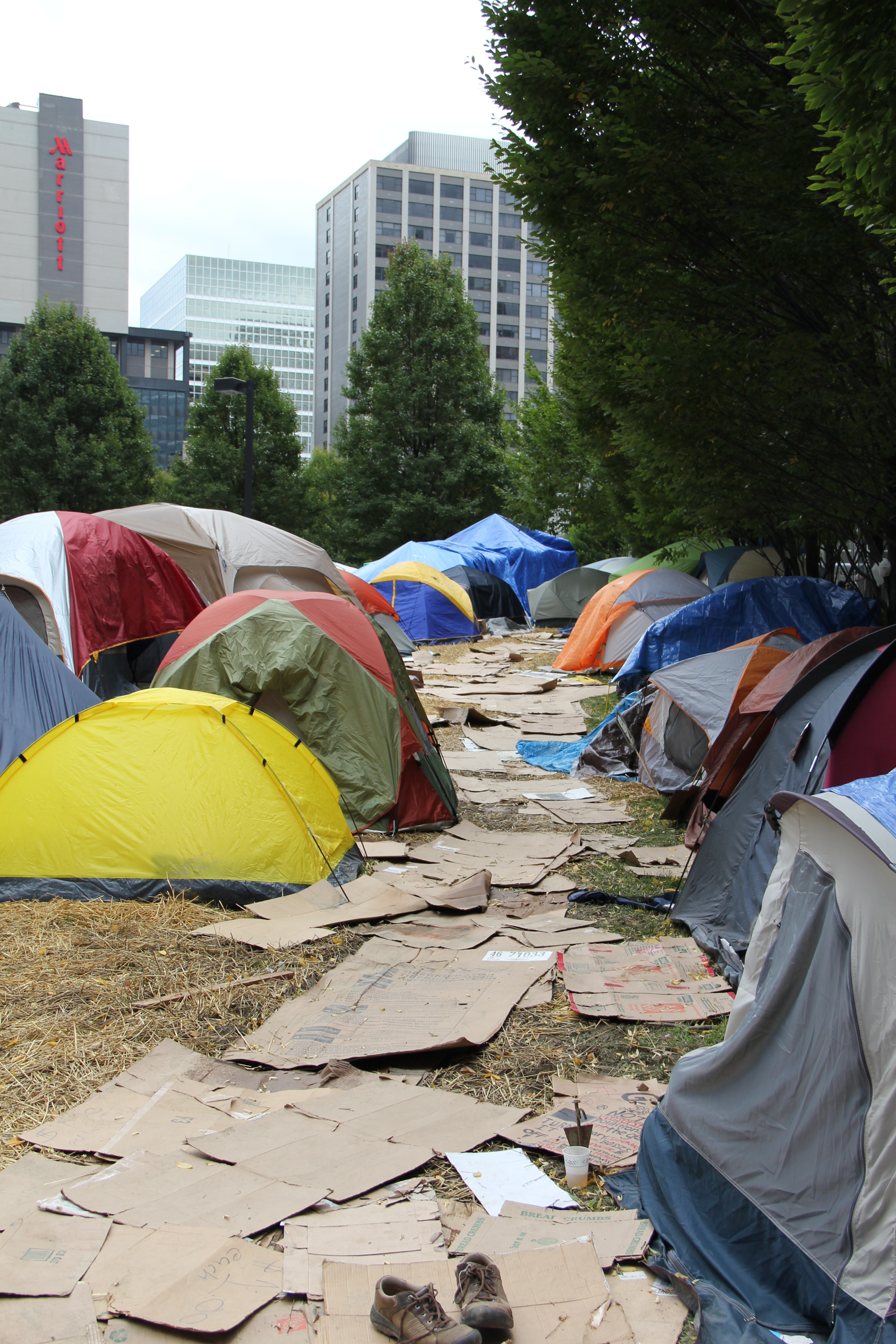
Occupy Pittsburgh protest

Mellon Green is an urban park in Downtown Pittsburgh, Pennsylvania.

The green, bounded by Grant Street, Ross Street, and Oliver and Sixth avenues, is surrounded by many prominent downtown buildings including the U.S. Steel Tower, BNY Mellon Center (the long-time global headquarters of Mellon Financial), the Omni William Penn Hotel and is on top of the Steel Plaza Subway station and its retail and officespace. It has long been a popular lunchtime destination for downtown workers.

The park opened in 1985 along with the completion of BNY Mellon Center. In the early 1990s the still largely undeveloped landscape was slated to become the "City Center" Retail/Office complex extending two blocks east to Ross Street and Interstate 579 and to include at least one high-rise and two mid-rise skyscrapers. Due to changing demographics/shopping patterns in the mid-1990s and the credit crunch/recession that lasted through 1994, the project was scrapped and the "Mellon Green" landscaping and parkscaping concept was developed by the end of the decade.

In June 2001, the public fountain, known as the Mellon Green Fountain, was completed. The owner enlisted the local landscape architecture firm Marshall, Tyler, Rausch to prepare design and construction documents for the fountains' construction. The owner wanted a water feature at the center of the Mellon Green to draw people into the green space through the use of amplified water noise and vibrant action. It could not have a front or back so that visitors could have direct access to the water. It could not have standing pools of water and had to fit comfortably into the surrounding landscape elements.

The fountain's circular area measures 29 feet (8.8 m) in diameter. The site slopes from Ross Street down to Grant Street at approximately six percent, therein creating a difficult area in which to control the direction of water flow.

In 2011, it was the base for the Occupy Pittsburgh protest.

== See also ==
- Mellon Square
