= Occupy Pittsburgh =

Protest group against economic inequality

- Part of the "Occupy" protests
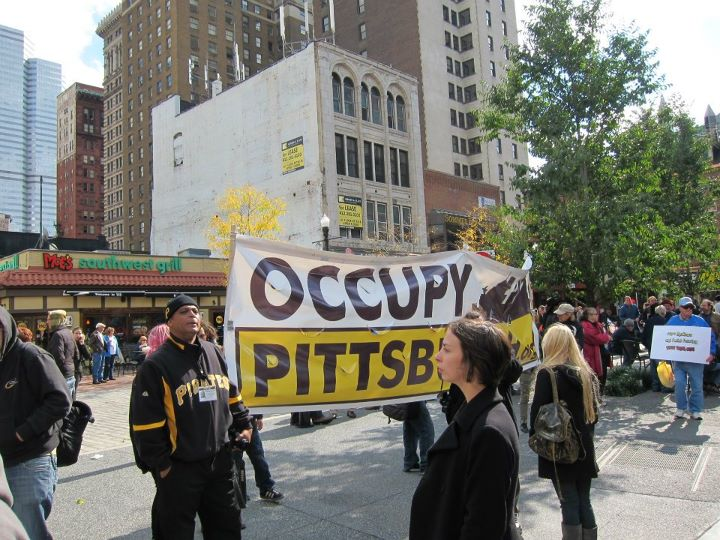
- Image from Occupy Pittsburgh 2011
- Date: 15 October 2011 – 8 February 2012
- Location: Pittsburgh, Pennsylvania, United States
- Caused by: Economic inequality, corporate influence over government, inter alia.
- Methods: Demonstration, occupation, protest, street protesters
- Status: Ended February 8, 2012

Arrests and injuries
- Injuries: 0
- Arrested: 5

Occupy Pittsburgh was a collaboration that has included peaceful protests and demonstrations, with an aim to overcome economic inequality, corporate greed and the influence of corporations and lobbyists on government. The protest took place at several locations in Pittsburgh, notably Market Square, Mellon Green, East Liberty neighborhood and the city's Oakland neighborhood adjacent to the University of Pittsburgh and Carnegie Mellon University.

== Overview ==
The protests began on October 15, 2011 and drew as many as 4,000 people. The protests included an encampment at Mellon Green. Although the park is privately owned by BNY Mellon, it initially did not request protesters to vacate, the movement citing the "public space" provisions of the city code to justify their occupation. After BNY Mellon filed in court on December 12, 2011 to end the encampment, Occupy Pittsburgh members responded by serving notice to evict the corporation from Pittsburgh.

On February 8, 2012, the movement peacefully left Mellon Green after a court order was issued.

== See also ==
Occupy articles
- List of global Occupy protest locations
- Occupy movement
- Timeline of Occupy Wall Street
- We are the 99%

Other U.S. protests

- 2011 United States public employee protests
- 2011 Wisconsin protests

Related articles

- Income inequality in the United States
- Lobbying
- Plutocracy
- Wealth inequality in the United States

Related portals:
