= Eppley Hotel Company =

U.S. Hotel chain 1917–1956

- Type: Private
- Industry: Hospitality
- Founded: 1917; 109 years ago
- Founder: Eugene C. Eppley
- Headquarters: Omaha, Nebraska, U.S.

The Eppley Hotel Company was located in Omaha, Nebraska. At the time of its acquisition by the Sheraton Corporation in 1956, it had 22 properties, and it was the largest privately held hotel business in the United States.

== About ==
Owned by hotel magnate Eugene C. Eppley, the company was established in 1917. By 1956 it owned 22 hotels spread across six states.

=== Properties ===
During its operation, the Eppley Hotel Company owned and operated hotels throughout the Midwestern United States and Pennsylvania. By 1956, its portfolio consisted of 22 properties across six states. Some of the most notable hotels included Pittsburgh's William Penn Hotel, the Seelbach Hotel in Louisville, Kentucky, the Hotel Fontenelle in Omaha, Nebraska, and Sioux City's Warrior Hotel that was built in 1929 but had its Grand Opening December 20th 1930.

Eppley Hotels sold the Warrior and most of its hotel assets to the Sheraton Corporation of America in 1956.

Omaha's Hotel Fontenelle was built in 1914. The Fontenelle hosted dignitaries and luminaries of all sorts, including Presidents Harry S. Truman and John F. Kennedy. After Eppley sold it to the Sheraton corporation, the hotel eventually went to ruins, closing in the 1970s. It was demolished in 1983.

The West Hotel in Sioux City, Iowa (which was built in 1903 and became part of the Eppley chain of hotels in the mid-1930s), was razed in 1953.

In 1927, Eppley commissioned four murals by Grant Wood for his hotels in Council Bluffs, Cedar Rapids, Waterloo, and Sioux City. The original piece painted for Eppley's Martin Hotel dining room in Sioux City, one of the Corn Room series, is now located in the Sioux City Art Center.

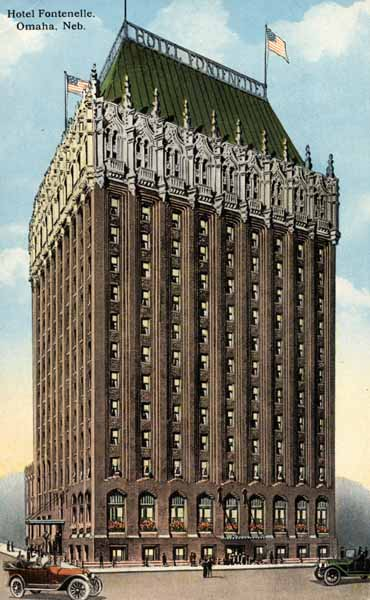
The Hotel Fontenelle, located from 1915 to 1983 in Downtown Omaha, Nebraska.

Hotels in the Eppley chain
Name	City	Notes
Hotel Norfolk	Norfolk, Nebraska	
Hotel Lincoln	Lincoln, Nebraska	
Hotel Capital	Lincoln, Nebraska	
Hotel Lindell	Lincoln, Nebraska	
Hotel Fontenelle	Omaha, Nebraska	Built in 1914, this hotel was Omaha's prominent hotel for more than 50 years. It was demolished in 1983.
Hotel Rome	Omaha, Nebraska	
Logan Apartment Hotel	Omaha, Nebraska	
Hotel Alex Johnson	Rapid City, South Dakota	
Hotel Cataract	Sioux Falls, South Dakota	
Hotel Carpenter	Sioux Falls, South Dakota	
Hotel Warrior	Sioux City, Iowa	
Hotel Martin	Sioux City, Iowa	
Hotel West	Sioux City, Iowa	Razed in 1953
Hotel Tallcorn	Marshalltown, Iowa	
Hotel Chieftain	Council Bluffs, Iowa	
Hotel Lafayette	Clinton, Iowa	
Hotel Montrose	Cedar Rapids, Iowa	
Hotel Magnus	Cedar Rapids, Iowa	
Hotel Seelbach	Louisville, Kentucky	
Hotel Fort Pitt	Pittsburgh, Pennsylvania	
Hotel William Penn	Pittsburgh, Pennsylvania	
Hotel Alexandria	Los Angeles, California	
Elms Hotel	Excelsior Springs, Missouri	

== Merger ==
In 1956, Sheraton Corporation agreed to acquire the Eppley Hotel Company for $30 million. At the time of the acquisition, Eppley operated 22 hotels across six states. The transaction was then the second-largest hotel sale in U.S. history.

== See also ==
- History of Omaha
- Economy of Omaha, Nebraska
