= Martin Hotel (Sioux City, Iowa) =

- U.S. National Register of Historic Places
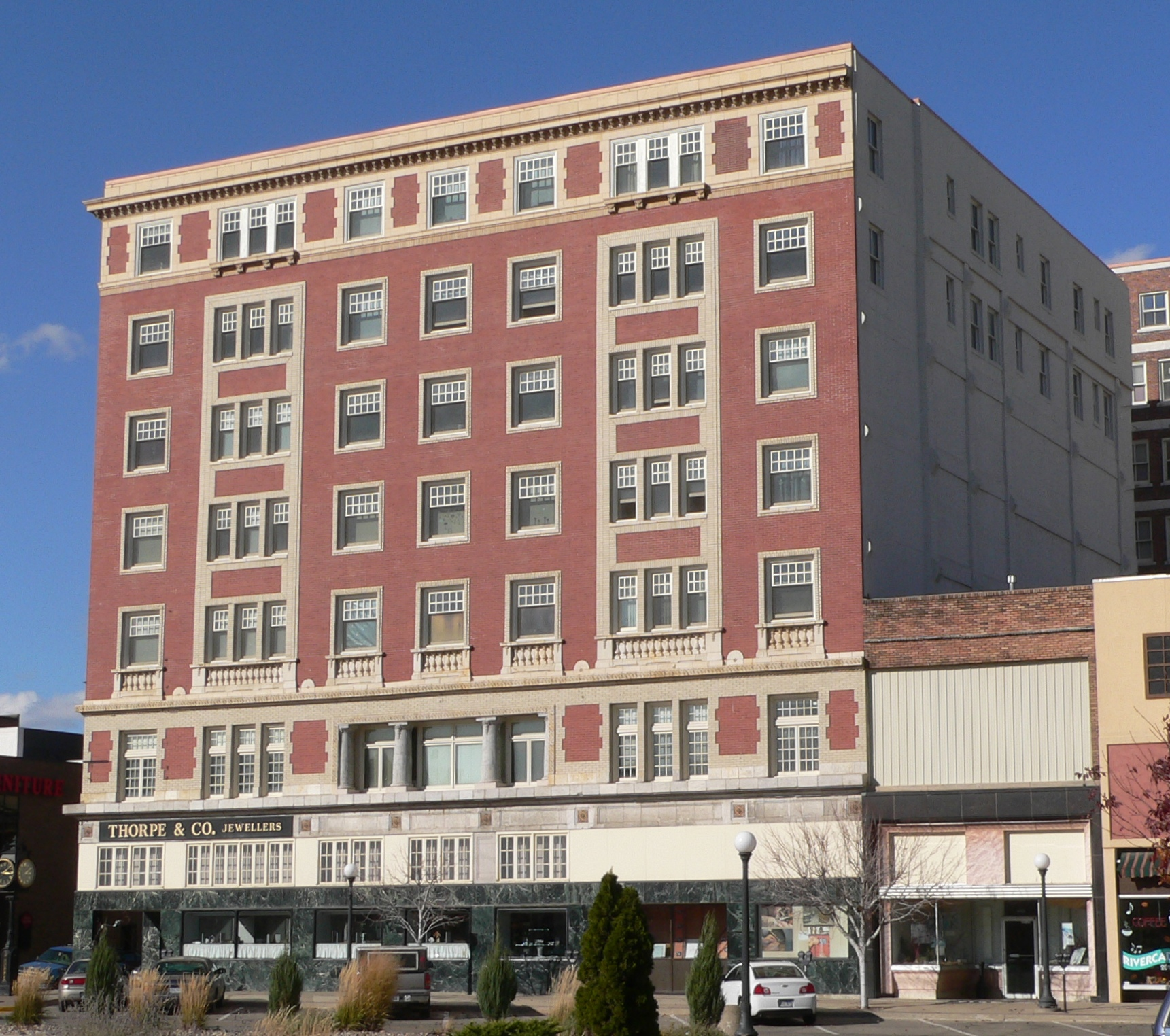
- View from the southeast, across 4th Street

- Location within Iowa Location within the United States
- Location: 410 Pierce St. Sioux City, Iowa
- Coordinates: 42°29′40.7″N 96°24′15.58″W
- Built: 1912
- Architectural style: Chicago
- NRHP reference No.: 83000414
- Added to NRHP: January 27, 1983

The Martin Hotel, erected as a Chicago style building in 1912, is located in Sioux City, Iowa. Added to the National Register of Historic Places in 1983, it is significant for its architecture, operating for many years as the Sheraton-Martin Hotel and now known as the Martin Tower Apartments.

== Construction ==
Because of people's excitement over the upcoming Interstate Fair, the Martin Hotel was constructed at the intersection of the Fourth Street Historic District and Pierce Street, in the city's downtown area. Features of the hotel included a ballroom, restaurant, cafeteria, and cigar stand.

The then current construction of the boiler room was written about in the fourteenth volume of The Reformatory Press, published in 1911, which stated that the room would be "30 feet wide, 55 feet long, and 22 feet deep". The boiler room would then be large enough to be considered one of the biggest heating rooms within the United States.

The Martin Hotel was one of Eugene C. Eppley's hotels from 1915 to 1956. In 1956, the hotel was renamed the Sheraton-Martin Hotel after being acquired by the Sheraton Corp.

== Restoration ==
In the 1980s, the hotel changed to an apartment rental complex, the Tower Hill Apartments.

Developer Lew Weinberg along with the same people who restored the Orpheum Theatre began to restore the ballroom, originally used by politicians and others, after being given permission to do so in 2001 by the council of Sioux City. The project was completed in 2004, resulting in the room being partly restored with some changes. Restored aspects of the ballroom include the stage, pillars, and carpet. New fixtures of the hotel include a kitchen, easy access for those with a disability, and the climate being controlled.

== Mural ==
Eugene C. Eppley, a businessman from Omaha, Nebraska, commissioned four murals for placement in his hotels, including the Martin Hotel. The mural entitled The Corn Room was painted in 1927 by Grant Wood for the Martin Hotel. Wood's style exemplified Regionalism, the only Modernist art movement to have originated in the Midwestern United States. The painting was lost under layers of paint and wallpaper, before being rediscovered decades later, in 1979.

The owner, Tower Properties, Ltd donated The Corn Room to the Sioux City Art Center, but in 1989 a bankruptcy court voided the donation, and ordered the mural sold at auction. An attorney in Sioux City, Alan Fredregill, purchased the work and later decided to donate it to the Art Center himself.

The mural was first shown in its entirety in 1992, later being fully shown for a second time in a 2007 Sioux City Art Center exhibition. The Corn Room then became a permanent exhibit within the art center.
