= Mellon Square =

Urban park in Downtown Pittsburgh, USA

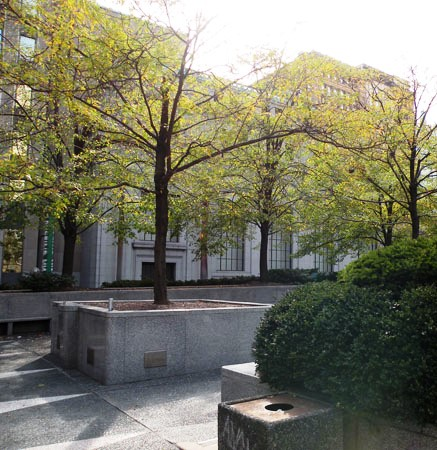
- Interactive map of Mellon Square
- Type: Municipal Park
- Location: Pittsburgh, Pennsylvania
- Coordinates: 40.432314°N 79.904904°W
- Area: 1-acre (0.40 ha)
- Created: September 28, 1953
- Operator: City of Pittsburgh Citiparks, Pittsburgh Parks Conservancy
- Parking: Underground parking garage
- Website: Official website

Pittsburgh Landmark – PHLF
- Designated: 1982

Mellon Square is an urban park in Downtown Pittsburgh, Pennsylvania, United States. It is the first Modernist park built above a parking garage. With its distinctive black, white, and green geometric pavement, it is a prominent urban oasis and gathering spot in Downtown Pittsburgh.

The square, bounded by Smithfield Street, William Penn Place, and Oliver and Sixth Avenues, is surrounded by prominent downtown buildings including the Oliver Building, 525 William Penn Place, Omni William Penn Hotel, and the Regional Enterprise Tower. It has long been a popular lunchtime destination for downtown workers. In addition, retail shops are housed underneath it, along the Smithfield Street side of the square.

== History ==
In the 1800s the site was home to Turner Hall, and in 1881 the world's first labor union, the Federation of Organized Trades and Labor Unions (later to become the AFL and part of the AFL-CIO) had its founding conference at the site. By the early 20th century the northern part of the block bordering Oliver Avenue was occupied by the Standard Oil Building (later to become the Peoples Gas Building) while the southern section of the block was occupied by the Davis Theater. On March 10, 1921 the first radio broadcast of live theater/opera was conducted by KDKA from the Davis Theater.

After World War II, the Aluminum Company of America (ALCOA), which was established in Pittsburgh in the 19th century, proposed to move to New York City. Banker Richard King Mellon aimed to block the move. In 1949 he proposed a new downtown headquarters building for ALCOA (now the Regional Enterprise Tower). As a bonus, it would have a nearby underground parking garage capped by a public plaza: Mellon Square, built in 1953-55, designed by Mitchell & Ritchey, landscaped by Simonds & Simonds, and paid for by Mellon family foundations. The Mellon family through various foundations gave a total of $4 million ($53.6 million in 2025 dollars) to help create the park, $3.5 million for property acquisition ($46.9 million in 2025 dollars) and $500,000 ($6.7 million in 2025 dollars) to build the parking garage and flora. On September 28, 1953 Pittsburgh City Council officially renamed the block "Mellon Square". Upon completion, Mellon gave the property to the City of Pittsburgh. Mellon Square is named in honor of Mellon's father and uncle, Richard Beatty Mellon (1858–1933) and Andrew Mellon (1855–1937). A dedication marker on ground level says: "Mellon Square is dedicated to the memory of two brothers, Andrew W. Mellon and Richard B. Mellon, their leadership, civic spirit and philanthropy advanced immeasurably the welfare of this community". The square is part of the Pittsburgh Central Downtown Historic District, which received National Register of Historic Places status in 1985.

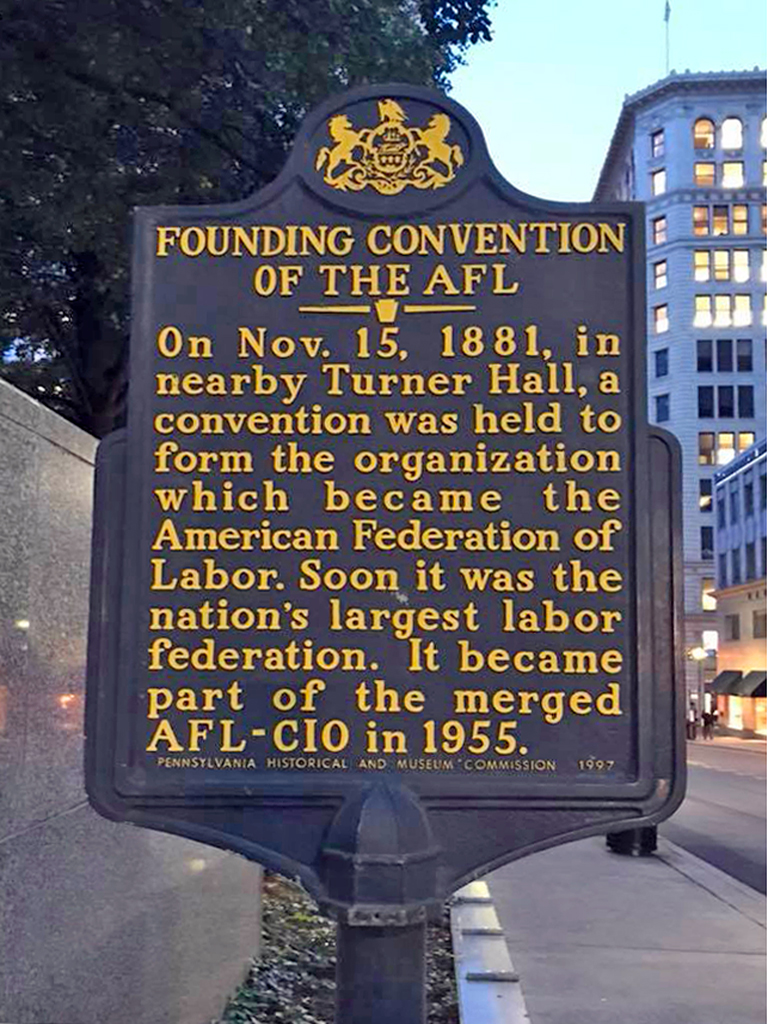
Historical marker

== Historical marker ==
A historical marker in the square commemorates the Founding Convention of the American Federation of Labor, which took place on November 15, 1881, in Turner Hall, near this location. This site is on the List of Pennsylvania state historical markers in Allegheny County.

== Fictional Portrayals ==
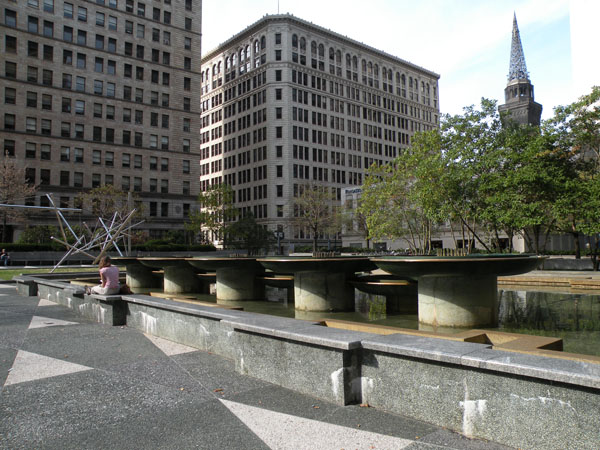
The Mellon Square Fountain

The Square serves as the backdrop to revealing scenes in the 2002 thriller The Mothman Prophecies with Richard Gere and Laura Linney. In the movie Gere travels to "Chicago" and meets "The Professor" in the square. Many Pittsburgh landmark buildings and cathedrals are showcased and get close-ups to add a visual layer to the revelations discussed in the square.

== Renovation ==
The Pittsburgh Parks Conservancy along with funding from the Richard King Mellon Foundation, The Colcom Foundation, The Eden Hall Foundation, BNY Mellon and other, spent $10 million and many years to renovate the square. The project replaced all of the original flooring and stairs, which had fallen into disrepair. The square re-opened to the public in May 2014.

== Trivia ==
- The square opened with over 25,000 trees, shrubs, and flowers.
- The nine circular bronze basins for the block-long fountain were in 1953 the largest ever cast.
- The Union Square underground garage in San Francisco served as inspiration for the facility and square.

== See also ==
- Mellon Green
- Market Square
