= Hotel Fontenelle =

Former hotel in Omaha, Nebraska, U.S.

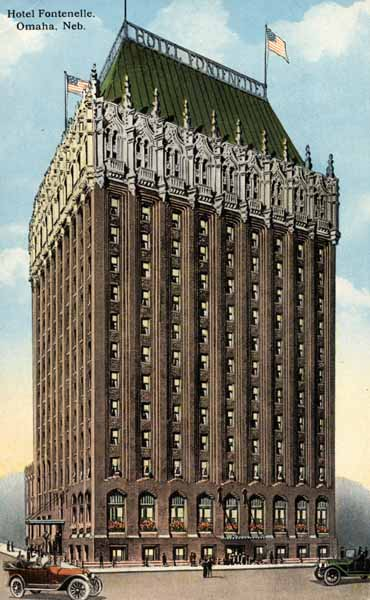
- Hotel Fontenelle in 1920
- Interactive map of the Hotel Fontenelle area

General information
- Location: Omaha, Nebraska, U.S., 1806 Douglas Street
- Coordinates: 41.259010799246454°N 95.9405058567221°W
- Groundbreaking: 1914
- Opened: February 26, 1915
- Demolished: 1983

Height
- Height: 175 feet (53 m)

Design and construction
- Architect: Thomas Rogers Kimball

Hotel Fontenelle was an upscale hotel located at 1806 Douglas Street, Downtown Omaha, Nebraska, United States. Designed by noted architect Thomas Rogers Kimball in the Late Gothic Revival style, the hotel opened in 1915. It closed in 1971 and was subsequently demolished in 1983. It was named after Logan Fontenelle, an interpreter for the Omaha Tribe.

== History ==
Hotel Fontenelle was announced in 1912 as a sixteen story hotel in Downtown Omaha. Designed by Thomas Rogers Kimball, the hotel used a Late Gothic Revival style. The following year, it would be named for Logan Fontenelle, an interpreter for the Omaha Tribe when it ceded land to the U.S. government which became the city of Omaha. The hotel began construction in 1914 and was built for the Douglas Hotel Company. The hotel officially opened on February 26, 1915.

In 1920, H. A. Wolf Co. purchased a majority of the Douglas Hotel Company. Ownership was later transferred to Gene Eppley and his company, the Eppley Hotel Company, the following year. The center of Omaha society, the hotel was the site of numerous civic events, weddings and conventions. These included the founding of the Girl Scout movement in Omaha. a national women's bowling tournament, and lectures by Willa Cather and other nationally known authors.

The Eppley Hotel Company was sold to Sheraton Hotels, for $30 million in 1956. It was the second-largest hotel sale in United States history. That same year, the hotel re-branded to the Sheraton-Fontenelle Hotel. Sheraton sold the hotel to Gotham Hotels in 1968 and it reverted to its original name. That same year, the hotel was used as the headquarters for Robert F. Kennedy's 1968 presidential campaign.

Hotel Fontenelle was temporarily closed in February 1971 by its owner as an economic move. The hotel later officially closed on February 28, 1971. Following its closure, several attempts were made to save the hotel. However, the City of Omaha purchased the hotel in 1982, after it was foreclosed. Demolition of the hotel began with the removal of its spires in February 1983, and demolition was completed in June of that same year.

== Architecture ==
Hotel Fontenelle was designed by Thomas Rogers Kimball and used a Late Gothic Revival style. The hotel had eighteen floors and was 175 feet (53 m) tall. The hotel originally had 350 guest rooms.

== Notable guests ==
The Fontenelle hosted many celebrities and politicians through the years, including Lou Gehrig and Babe Ruth, as well as president Harry S. Truman, who was a personal friend of Gene Eppley. Senator John F. Kennedy and his wife Jacqueline stayed at the hotel during his campaign for the 1960 Presidential election.

== See also ==
- History of Omaha
- Yule Marble
