= Chieftain Hotel =

- Hotel Chieftain
- U.S. National Register of Historic Places
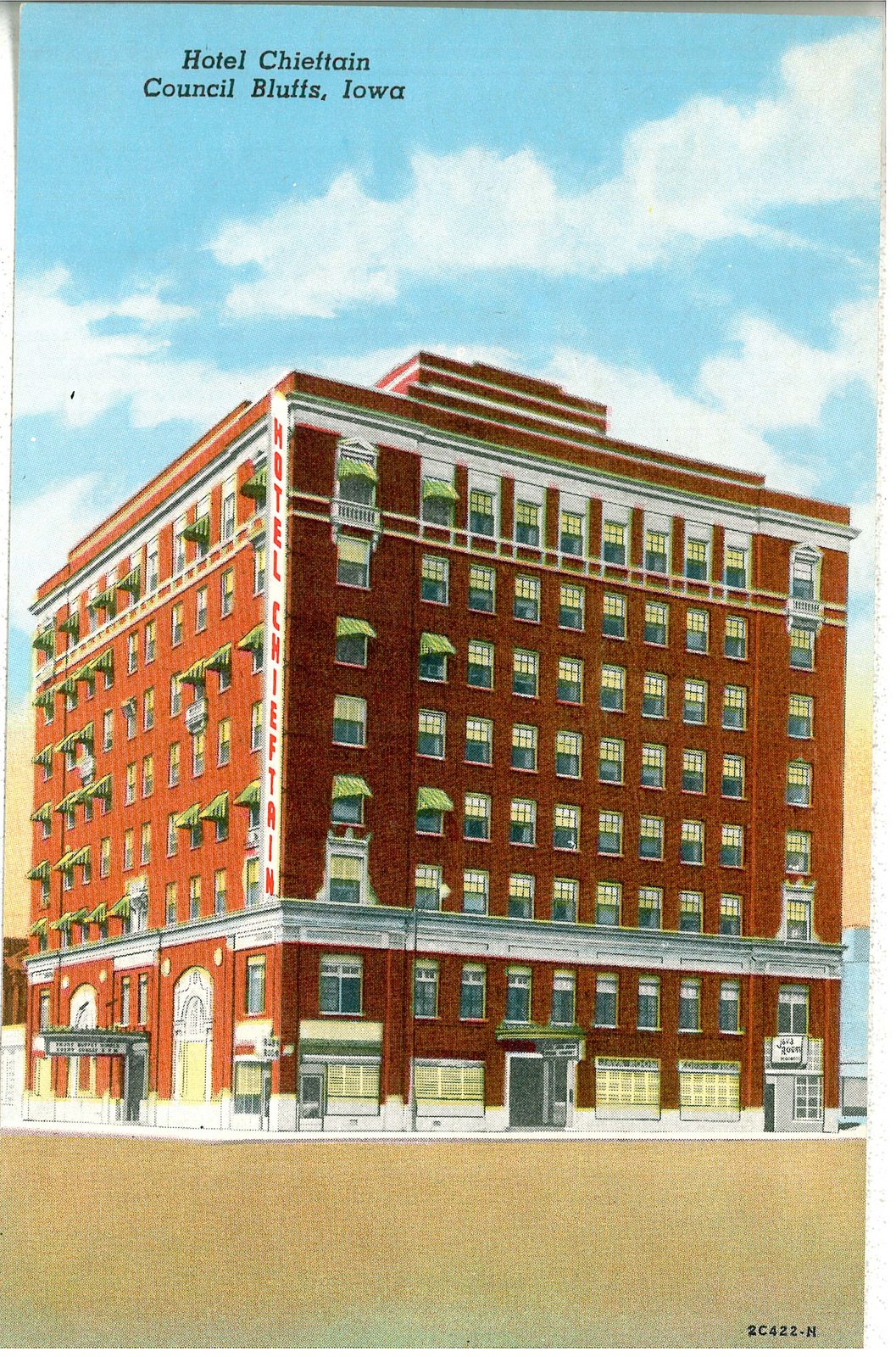

- Location within Iowa Location within the United States
- Location: 38 Pearl St. Council Bluffs, Iowa
- Coordinates: 41°15′35.6″N 95°51′03.4″W
- Area: less than one acre
- Built: 1927
- NRHP reference No.: 14000286
- Added to NRHP: June 6, 2014

The Chieftain Hotel is a historic former hotel building at 38 Pearl Street in Council Bluffs, Iowa, United States. It opened in 1927, the result of a partnership between the Eppley Hotel Company and local patrons, and was built on the site of the Grand Hotel, which had opened in 1891 and was destroyed by a fire in 1925. The hotel was eight stories tall, and featured 153 guest rooms.

Eppley owned and operated the hotel until 1956, when the chain was sold to Sheraton, which sold it off, along with several other Eppley hotels. After several management and ownership changes, it went into receivership to the First National Bank of Council Bluffs in 1966 and closed in 1970.

It originally had two restaurants: The Terrace Cafe and the Java Room, and a cocktail lounge named The Ruby Room. All were located on the lobby level, and both the Java Room and Ruby Room were accessible from the street as well as from the hotel. The Terrace Cafe featured a Loggia which looked out on Bayliss Park across the street, and was decorated in the Adam style . During the Depression, The Terrace Cafe was converted to a banquet room. It remained a banquet room for the remainder of the time the hotel operated.

The bobby was situated along the south side of the building and was a two-story space open to the mezzanine above.

The second level consisted of four private dining rooms (Corn Room, State Suite, Pioneer Room, and The Beaux Arts Room) on the Pearl Street side of the building, and the Trianon Ballroom. In addition, a u-shaped mezzanine area adjacent to the Ballroom looked down onto the lobby below. The Corn Room and the Pioneer Room, were decorated with Murals painted by Iowa Artist Grant Wood.

The Trianon Ballroom is named after a palace near Versailles, France, and could seat upwards of 500 guests. It was one of the original performance spaces for Council Bluffs' Chanticleer Community Theatre.

After the hotel closed, the lobby and Terrace Cafe space were partitioned off and served as the Council Bluffs Elk's Club for many years, and the Java Room became a Godfather's Pizza. The former Ruby Room cocktail lounge has been used for many purposes, including congressional offices. The private dining rooms were converted to apartments, but the Ballroom remains intact.

The facility is now known as Bluffs Towers, a low-income apartment house, primarily for senior citizens and people with disabilities. It was listed on the National Register of Historic Places in 2014.
