= Seelbach Hotel =

American Historical Hotel in Louisville, Kentucky

The Seelbach Hilton Louisville
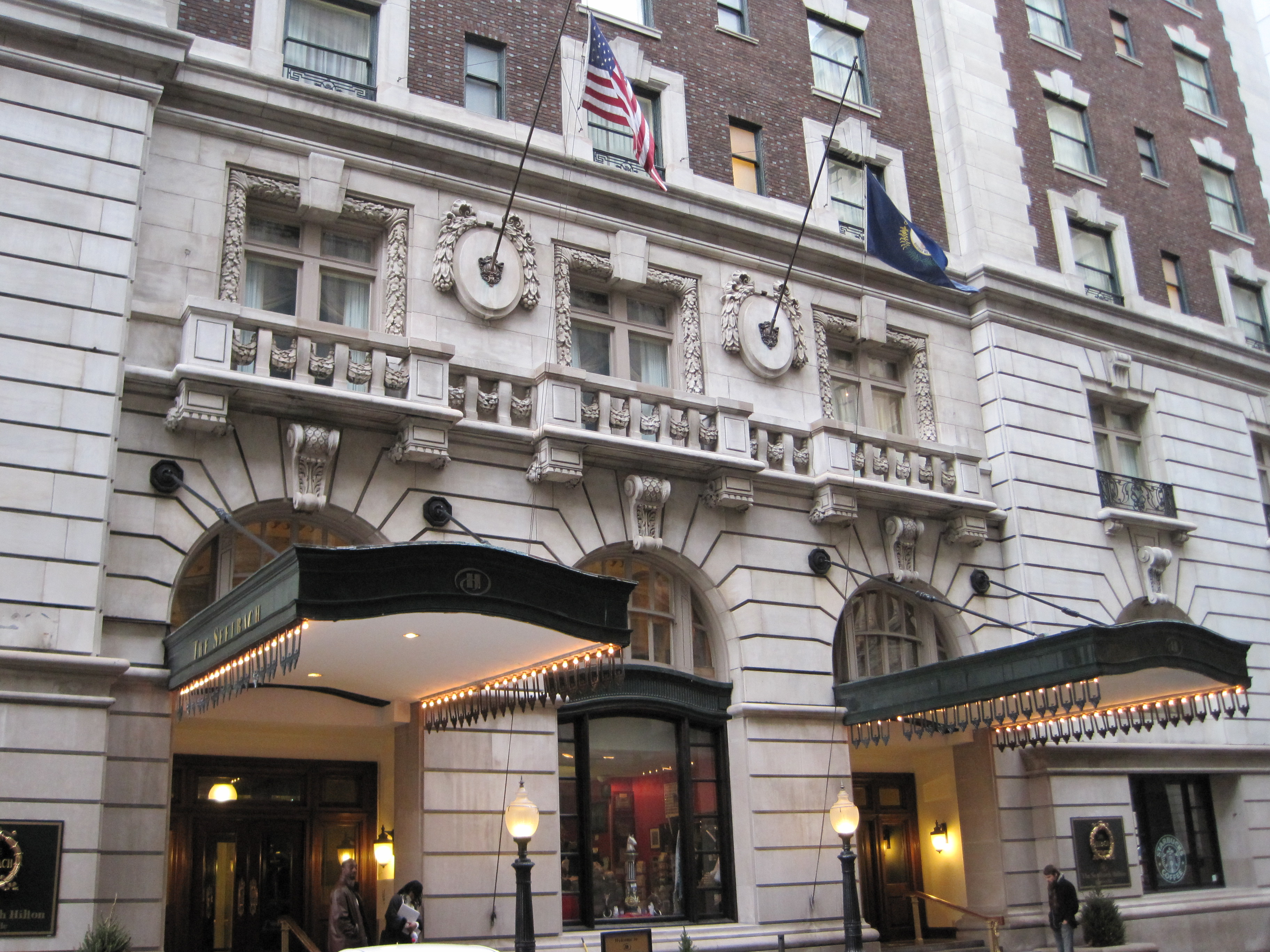
- The Seelbach Hilton Hotel
- Interactive map of the The Seelbach Hilton Louisville area

General information
- Location: 500 South 4th Street, Louisville, Kentucky, United States, 40202
- Coordinates: 38°15′3″N 85°45′29″W
- Opening: May 1, 1905
- Owner: Rockbridge Capital
- Operator: Hilton Hotels

Design and construction
- Architects: Frank Mills Andrews, William J. Dodd and Paul Emil Moosmiller

Website
- www.seelbachhilton.com
- Seelbach Hotel
- U.S. National Register of Historic Places
- Area: 2 acres (0.81 ha)
- Architectural style: Beaux Arts Baroque
- NRHP reference No.: 75000775
- Added to NRHP: August 12, 1975

The Seelbach Hilton Louisville is an historic hotel in Louisville, Kentucky, United States. Founded by Bavarian-born immigrant brothers Louis and Otto Seelbach, it opened in 1905 as the Seelbach Hotel, and is designed in the French Renaissance style. The hotel has hosted numerous celebrities, including F. Scott Fitzgerald, who took inspiration from the Seelbach for a hotel in The Great Gatsby. The hotel is part of the Hilton Hotels & Resorts chain.

== History ==
=== The Seelbach brothers ===
Louis Seelbach and his brother Otto emigrated from Frankenthal, Germany, a small, rural town in Bavaria. Louis arrived in Louisville in 1869 at age 17, shortly after reaching the United States. He worked in the first Galt House Hotel for a time. He turned 22 in 1874 and opened the Seelbach Bar & Grill that year, which he quickly built into a flourishing enterprise. The restaurant's success and Louisville's quickly expanding population and economy allowed him to bring his brother Otto from Germany to help open the first Seelbach Hotel in 1891 above the bar & grill at 6th and Main.

=== Construction ===
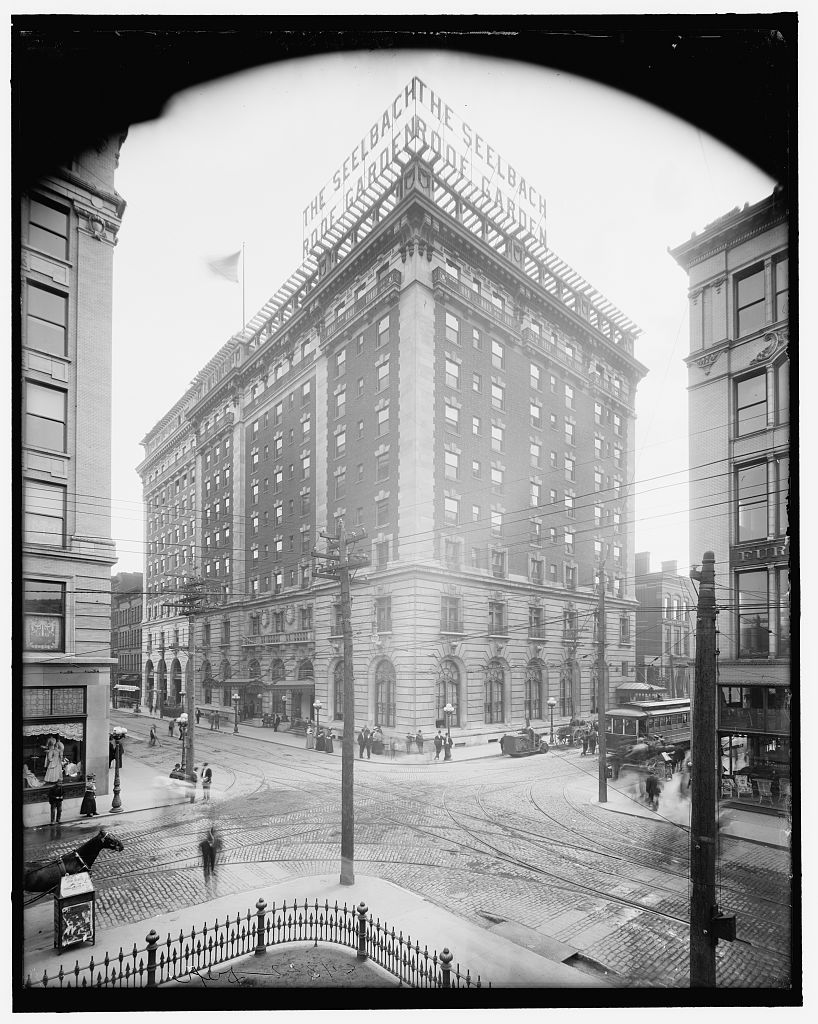
The Seelbach Hotel, 1910

The brothers were intent on building Louisville's first grand hotel: a hotel reflecting the opulence and old-world grandeur of European hotels in cities like Vienna and Paris. They formed the Seelbach Hotel Co and purchased a piece of property at the corner of 4th and Walnut (now Muhammad Ali Boulevard) streets. They broke ground in December 1903, and the Seelbach Hotel opened its doors on May 1, 1905, just in time for the Kentucky Derby.

On opening day, over 25,000 people visited the hotel. The Seelbach hosted a gala that evening, with dinner parties in each of the 150 rooms. The structure incorporated marble from Italy, Germany, and France, along with wood from the West Indies and Europe.

The hotel attracted large numbers of patrons in its first two years, and, luckily, the Seelbach Realty Company—formed in 1902 before the property purchase—had been planning from opening day to expand the hotel. On January 1, 1907, the second phase opened, raising the number of rooms to 500. The lower two floors of the ten-story structure were faced with stone, while the upper floors were brick. Work included enclosing the rooftop garden to allow it to be used as a winter garden. The Seelbach regularly hosted guests of the Kentucky Derby.

=== Middle years ===
In 1925, Louis Seelbach, president of the Seelbach Hotel Co., died. On April 1, 1926, Chicago-based businessman Abraham M. Liebling bought the hotel for approximately $2.5 million. In 1929, he sold the hotel to the Eppley Hotel Company for $2 million. Mr. Eppley, of Omaha, Nebraska, owned many hotels throughout the Midwest. He sold the Seelbach, along with his other properties, to Sheraton Hotels in 1956, as part of a $30 million deal. This made the Seelbach part of the second-largest hotel sale in US history at the time. The hotel became the Sheraton-Seelbach Hotel, but its name was soon shortened to just the Sheraton Hotel. Sheraton sold the hotel, along with seventeen other aging properties, to Gotham Hotels in 1968, and it regained its original name. Following a severe national economic slump, the hotel closed in July 1975, after the owners went bankrupt.

=== Restoration and modern era ===
In 1978, Louisville native and Hollywood television actor Roger Davis bought the Seelbach. Restoration work began in early 1979, and a grand re-opening was held on April 12, 1982. National Hotels Corporation, a subsidiary of Radisson Hotels and DoubleTree Hotels, managed the hotel.

The Seelbach was sold to Medallion Hotels in 1990. In 1998, Cap Star Hotels (later MeriStar Hospitality Corp) bought the hotel from Medallion, along with five other properties, for $150 million, and it became the Seelbach Hilton.

The Blackstone Group purchased MeriStar's 57 hotels in 2006 for $2.6 billion. Blackstone sold the Seelbach in 2007 to a joint venture, with Interstate Hotels & Resorts holding 15 percent and Investcorp holding 85 percent. In 2009, the hotel was renovated at a cost of $12 million. In 2017, the hotel was sold to Columbus-based Rockbridge Capital.

== Impact on Louisville ==
At the time of construction, little else existed in the area around 4th and Walnut streets. When the Seelbach brothers proposed their project, the Mayor of Louisville said, "No one will come to a hotel so far away." Several others attempted to discourage building on property so far from the "center" of Louisville. Since then, Louisville has expanded, and the Seelbach Hotel has long been astride one of the city's booming shopping and business districts. Between the 1930s and 1960s, the Seelbach Hotel even anchored an area with Louisville's "best shops". Although it fell into disrepair for a period, today the area is again a bustling cultural and commercial center. The area surrounding the hotel is filled with other large hotels in competition for the Louisville area guests. Not only has the city grown around the hotel, but more hotel owners were inspired to build in the same area after seeing the Seelbach's success.

== Notable guests ==
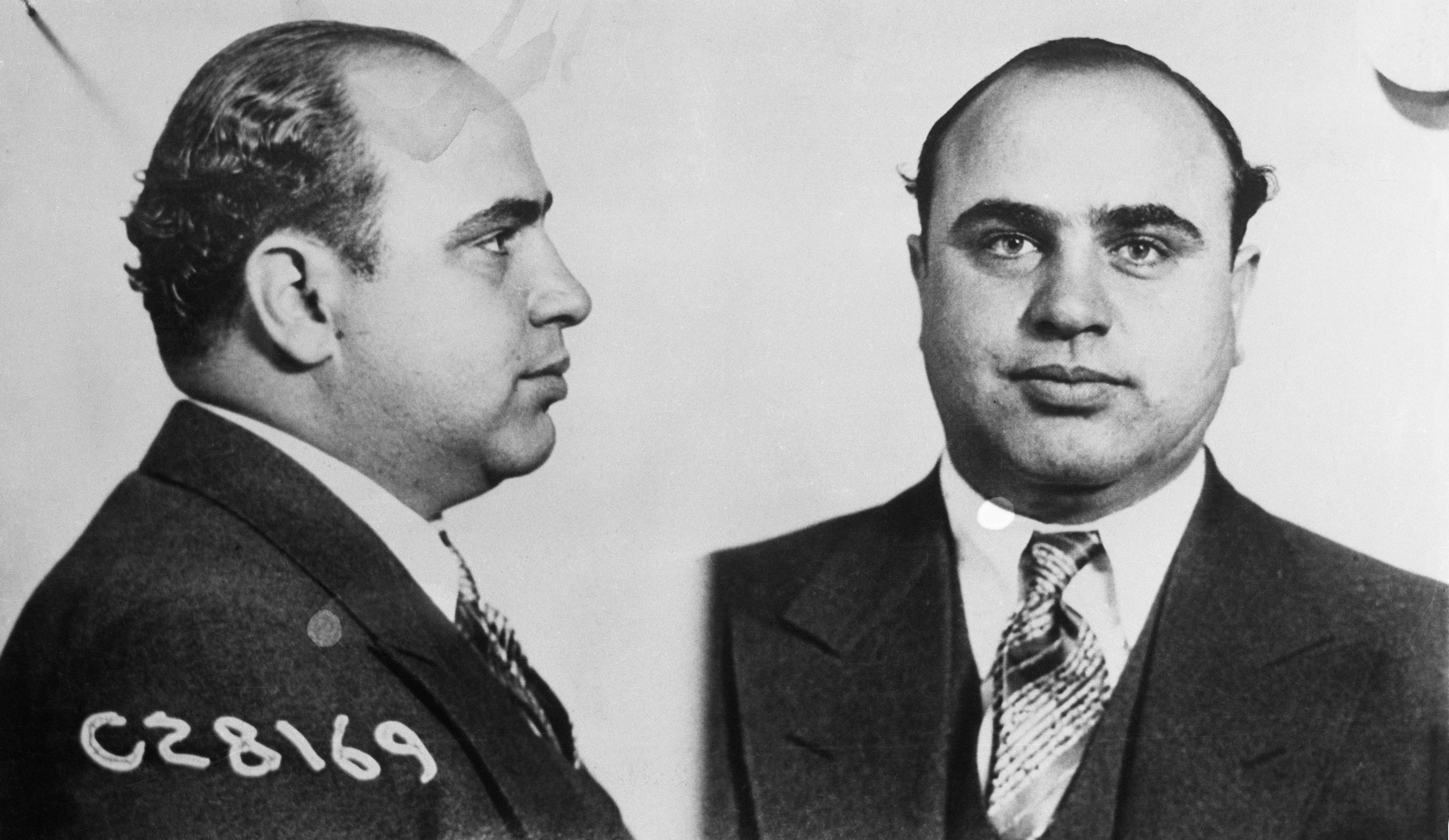
Al Capone, a frequent Seelbach guest

=== 9 U.S. Presidents ===
Many US presidents have chosen to spend time at the hotel while in Louisville, including William Howard Taft (1911), Woodrow Wilson (1916), Franklin D. Roosevelt (1938), Harry Truman (1948), John F. Kennedy (1962), Lyndon B. Johnson (1964), Jimmy Carter (1970s), Bill Clinton (1998), and George W. Bush (2002).

=== Gangsters ===
Lucky Luciano, Dutch Schultz, and Al Capone—who was a frequent guest of the Seelbach—stayed at the hotel, often for clandestine poker games. One story from the 1920s involves Capone sneaking out through a series of secret stairways and tunnels when Louisville police broke up one of these games.

=== Others ===
The Rolling Stones, Whitney Houston, Elvis Presley, Billy Joel, Robin Williams, Russell Crowe, Julia Child, Wolfgang Puck, Donnie Wahlberg, Shorty Rossi, and reality TV personality of Pit Boss are among the celebrities who have stayed at the Seelbach.

F. Scott Fitzgerald frequented the hotel in April 1918, while training for his deployment in World War I. One night, after expensive bourbon and cigars, he had to be restrained and was ejected from the hotel. This experience seemingly did not tarnish his memories, as he later included a fictional hotel akin to the Seelbach as the setting for the wedding of Tom and Daisy Buchanan in The Great Gatsby. In this story it is mentioned that Tom "[r]ented out an entire floor of the Mulbach hotel", which could either refer to the Grand Ballroom (once located on the roof of the hotel) or the Rathskeller room (located in the basement) where Fitzgerald often went to the bar.

== Assessment ==
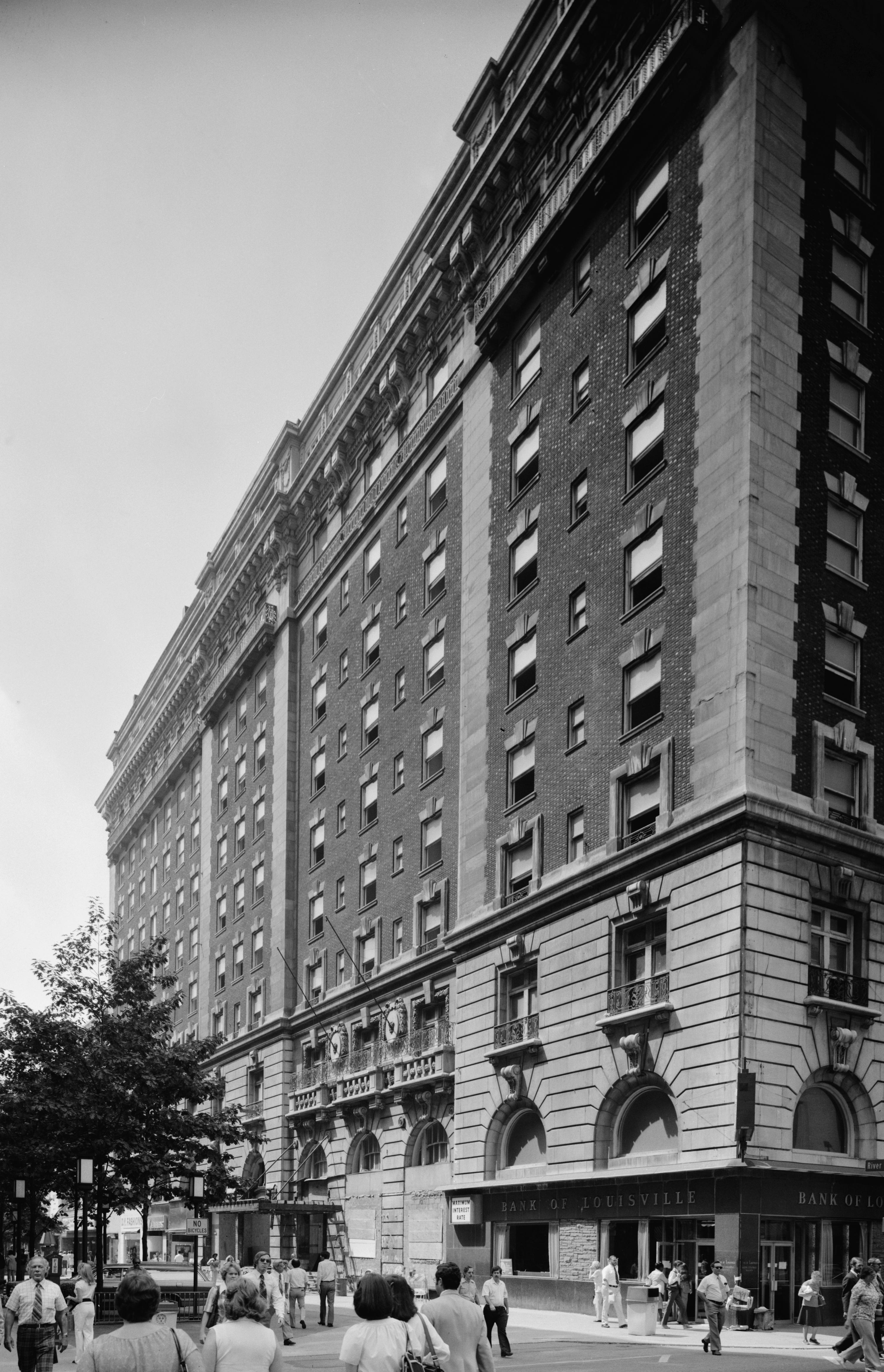
The Seelbach undergoing restoration work in 1979

The hotel appears on the National Register of Historic Places and is considered "Louisville's Historic Hotel".

== Restaurants ==
The Seelbach has a breakfast room called Gatsby's on Fourth, a bar, and a Starbucks.

The hotel formerly had a historic restaurant called the Oakroom, which was Kentucky's only AAA Five Diamond Restaurant Award winner, one of 44 in the nation. It closed in 2018 and was converted to a ballroom.

The Rathskellar, decorated with Rookwood Pottery, was a rare and distinctively Seelbach south-German influenced restaurant. Today the Rathskeller is also used as a ballroom. Coming from German, the term "Rathskeller" means "council's cellar", and is a common name in German-speaking countries that refers to a bar or restaurant located in the basement of a city hall (Rathaus). The word "Rath" has nothing to do with the German word "Ratten" (rats), as has been mistakenly reported in some instances.

There is a cocktail named after the hotel, called the Seelbach, which contains bourbon, triple sec, and two kinds of bitters, and topped with a brut sparkling wine or champagne.

== In film ==
The 1999 movie The Insider was filmed in part in the hotel's lobby.

== See also ==
- List of Historic Hotels of America
- List of attractions and events in the Louisville metropolitan area
