= Vallabh Sambamurthy =

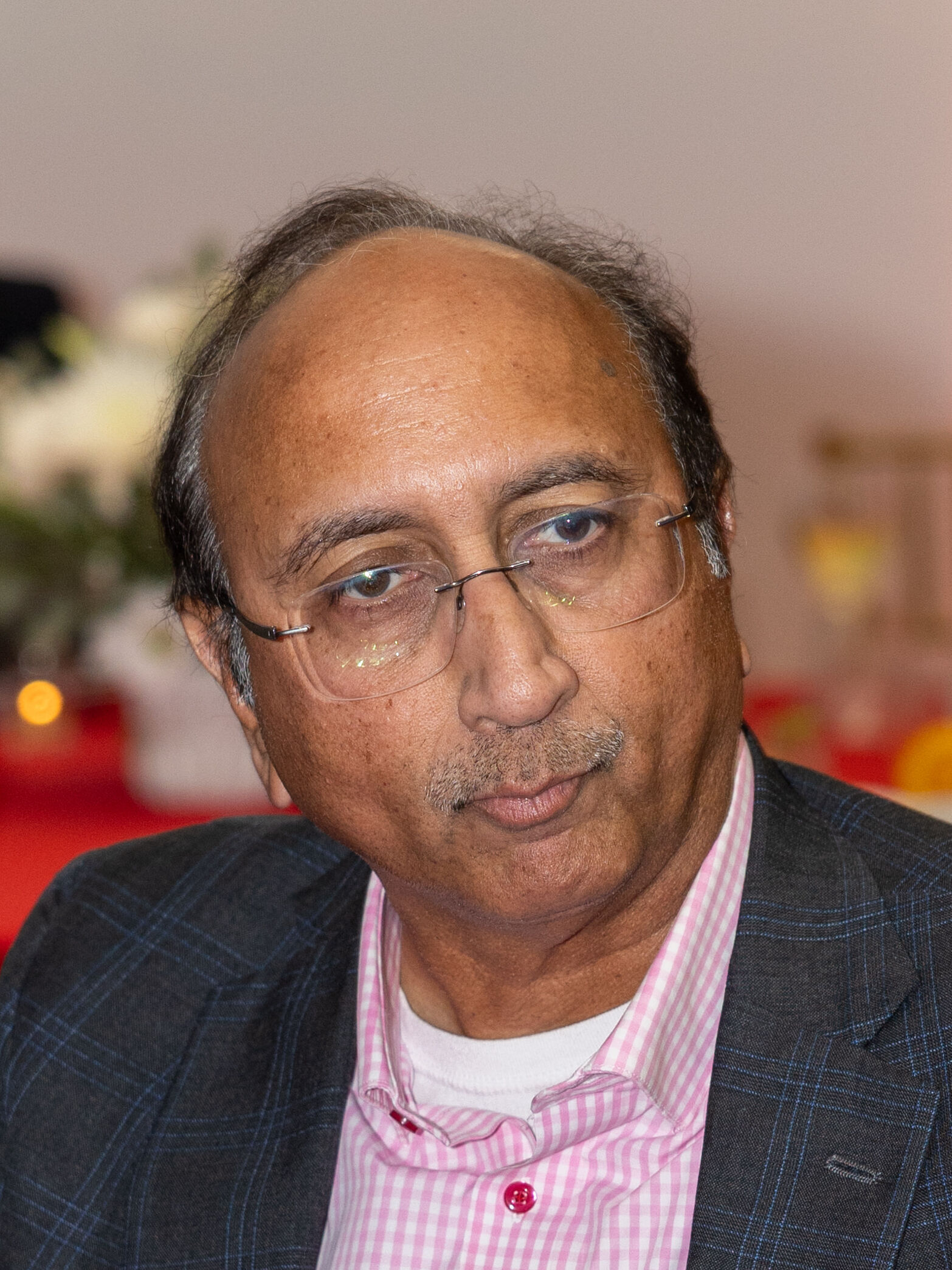
- Sambamurthy in 2024
- Born: India
- Education: National Institute of Technology, Tiruchirappalli (BE); Indian Institute of Management Calcutta; University of Minnesota (PhD)
- Occupation: Dean
- Organization: University of Wisconsin, Madison

Vallabh Sambamurthy is the Albert O. Nicholas Dean of the Wisconsin School of Business of the University of Wisconsin–Madison.

== Education ==
Vallabh Sambamurthy received his Bachelor of Engineering (B.E.) with honors in mechanical engineering from National Institute of Technology, Tiruchirappalli (formerly Regional Engineering College, Tiruchirappalli) in 1981. He received his Post Graduate Diploma in Management (PGDM) from Indian Institute of Management, Calcutta in 1983 and Doctorate of Philosophy degree from Carlson School of Management, University of Minnesota.

== Career ==
He has previously served at the business schools of University of Maryland, College Park and Florida State University. He served as the Editor-in-Chief of Information Systems Research, one of the most prestigious Information Systems journals, from 2005 to 2010. He also served as the Eli Broad Professor and Chair of the Department of Accounting and Information Systems at the Eli Broad College of Business at Michigan State University until January 2019.

== Awards ==
- Distinguished Alumnus Award by the National Institute of Technology Tiruchirappalli, India in 2009.
- The AIS Fellow Award by the Association for Information Systems in 2009
- John D. and Dortha J. Withrow Endowed Teacher Scholar Award by the Broad College and the Excellence in Research awards by the Accounting and Information Systems Department.
- William Beal Distinguished Faculty Award, the highest honor accorded by Michigan State University in 2014.
- The Sandra Slaughter Service Award by the Association for Information Systems in 2016
- The Leo Award by the Association for Information Systems in 2017
