= Regional Enterprise Tower =

Building in Pittsburgh, Pennsylvania

Alcoa Building
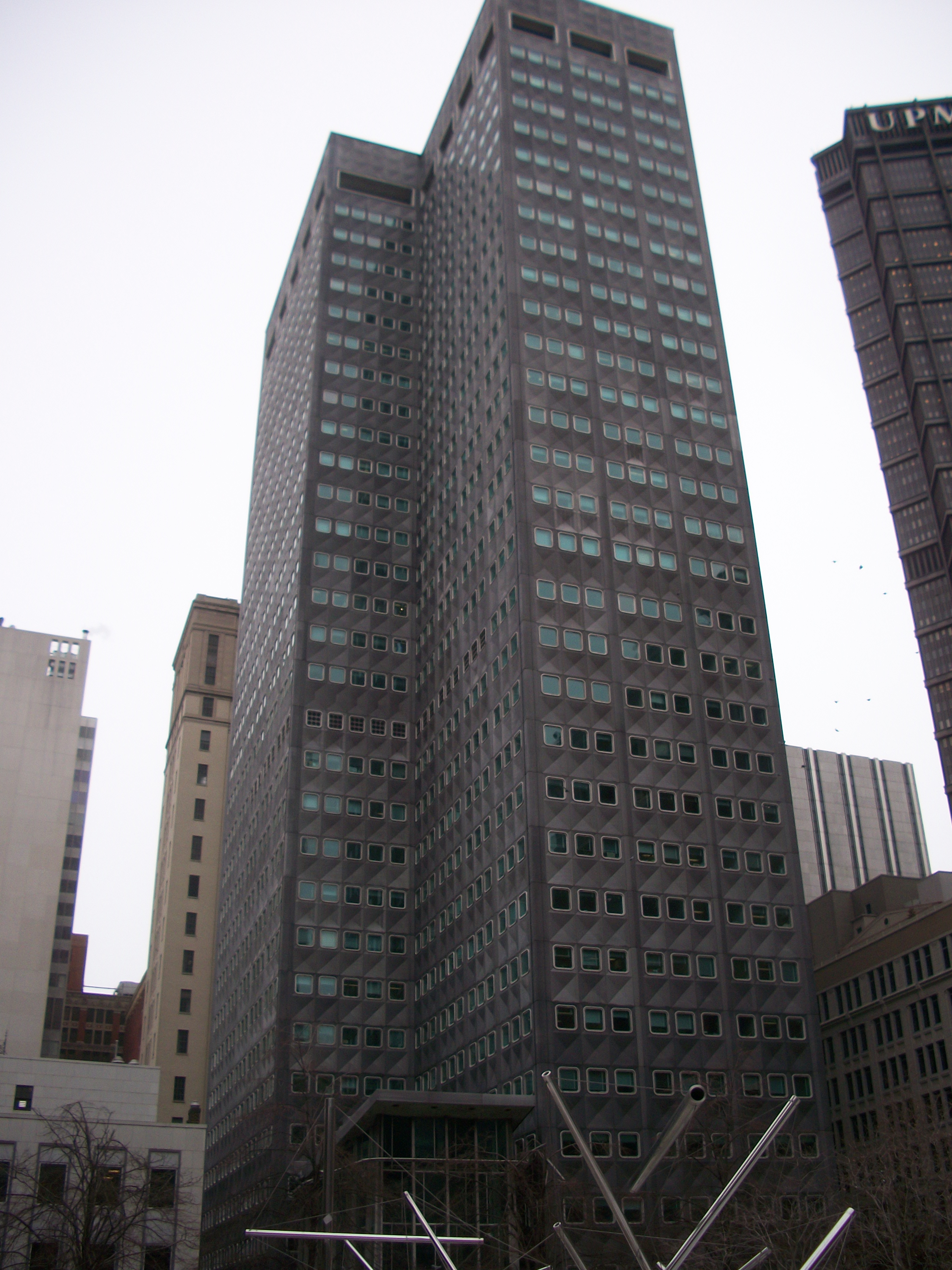

General information
- Type: Residential, Office, Retail
- Location: 425 6th Avenue
- Coordinates: 40°26′29″N 79°59′49″W
- Construction started: 1950
- Completed: 1953
- Owner: PMC Property Group
- Operator: PMC Property Group

Height
- Roof: 410 ft (120 m)
- Top floor: 396 ft (121 m)

Technical details
- Floor count: 31
- Lifts/elevators: 16 (7 operating)

Design and construction
- Architect: Harrison & Abramovitz
- Main contractor: George A. Fuller

Pittsburgh Landmark – PHLF
- Designated: 2004

The Alcoa Building (also known as the Regional Enterprise Tower) is a 410-foot-tall (120 m) skyscraper in downtown Pittsburgh, Pennsylvania. It was completed in 1953 and has 31 floors. It is the 15th-tallest building in the city and is adjacent to Mellon Square. In 2016, the top half of the building (floors 14-31) was converted to apartments known as The Residences at the Historic Alcoa Building.

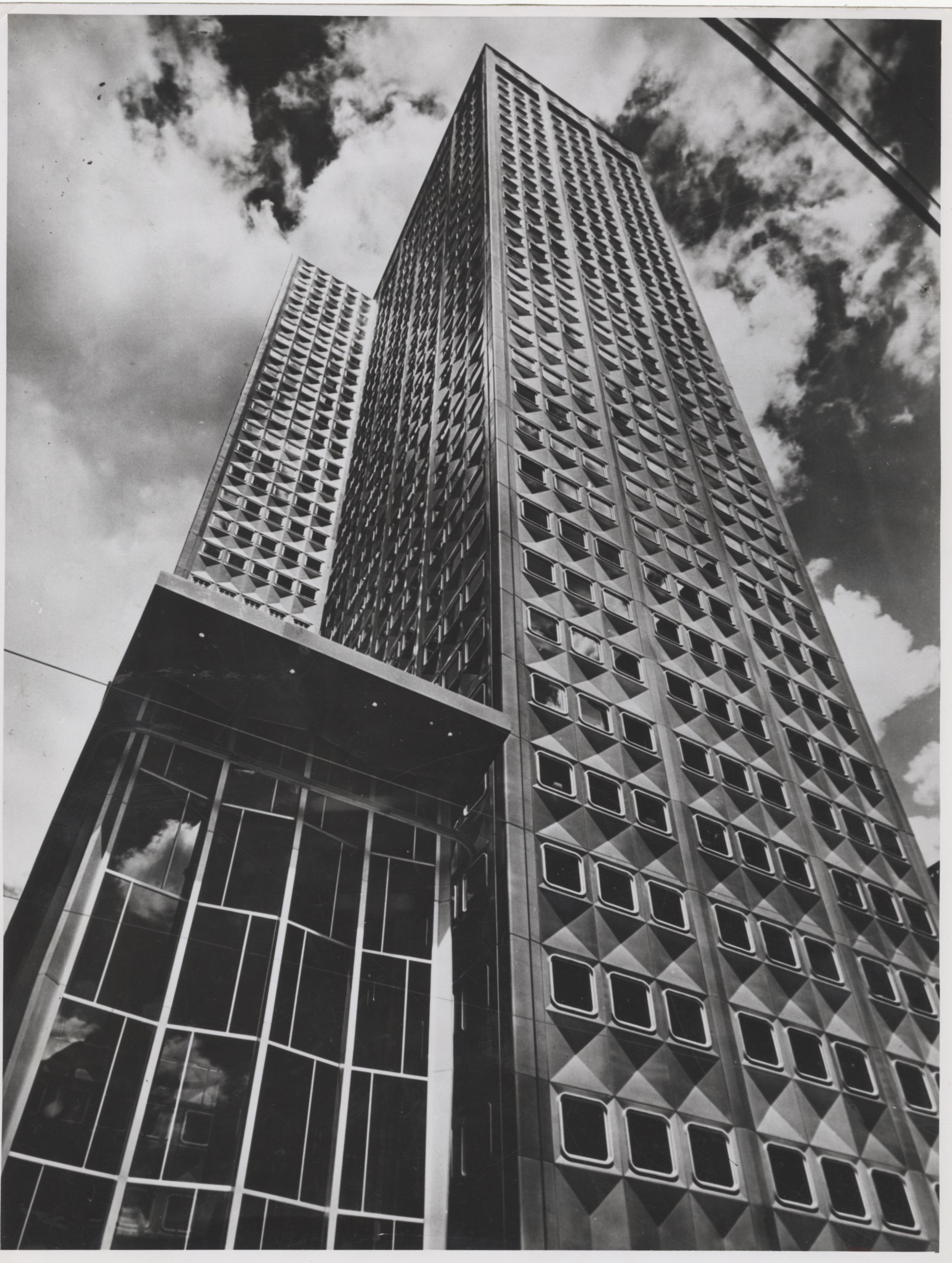
The Regional Enterprise Tower in 1957

== History ==
=== Nixon Theater ===
From December 7, 1903, until April 29, 1950, the site was home to the Nixon Theater, built by Samuel F. Nixon-Nirdlinger and Senator George T. Oliver. On opening night it was described as the "world's most perfect playhouse". An ornate Beaux Arts structure, crowned by a large dome it was arguably the most opulent theater in city history. S. Trevor Hadly in Only in Pittsburgh describes that the interior "was in the Louis XVth style. Inside were massive imitation Parawazza marble columns capped with solid gold. ... The side walls were paneled to look like damask silk ... framed in a molding and styling of green, gold, and red. Velvet and silk draperies added profusely to the décor." Productions such as the 1905 staging of Ben Hur used four horse-drawn chariots while Garden of Allah "called for a herd of camels, horses, and goats and 50 camel drivers." The sale of the site to Alcoa in 1950 was met with protests, with actress Katharine Hepburn writing to the city before demolition: "I'm infuriated, The new skyscraper will be just another building -- maybe fascinating, but not glamorous."

A second smaller and less glamorous incarnation carried the Nixon Theater name at 956 Liberty Avenue until 1976. That playhouse had opened in 1914 and previously operated under the names "The Victoria", "The Shubert" and "The Senator" but was renamed and refurbished by September 1950. During the 1950s and early 1960s it sponsored family fare but by the 1970s it featured adult entertainment and closed in 1976.

=== Alcoa Building ===
Originally the headquarters for the Aluminum Company of America (ALCOA), the unique aluminum walls of the building are 1/8 inch thick, which gives the building a very light weight and economical design. It was the first skyscraper with an all-aluminum facade. A unique radiant heating and cooling system is contained in the ceiling: since there are no pipes, radiators, or air conditioning units along the exterior walls, an additional 15,000 square feet (1,400 m^{2}) of rentable space was gained. The windows rotate so they can be washed from the inside.

Upon ALCOA's 2001 relocation to a new headquarters building on Pittsburgh's North Shore near PNC Park, the old ALCOA Building became a home to government entities, regional nonprofits and small start-up companies including the RIDC.

== The Residences at The Historic Alcoa Building ==
On July 14, 2015, PMC Property Group closed on a $40 million loan to redevelop floors 14-31 of the building as 241 class-A multi-family units, known as The Residences at The Historic Alcoa Building. The lower levels remain in use as 133,000 square feet (12,400 m^{2}) of office space, while the ground floor has 6,200 square feet (580 m^{2}) of retail, including restaurants. The apartments began renting in March 2016.

== See also ==
- List of tallest buildings in Pittsburgh

Preceded by Three PNC Plaza	Pittsburgh Skyscrapers by Height; 410 feet (125 m); 30 floors	Succeeded by One PNC Plaza
Preceded by Three Gateway Center	Pittsburgh Skyscrapers by Year of Completion; 1953	Succeeded by Wyndham Grand
