= Omni William Penn Hotel =

Hotel in Pittsburgh, Pennsylvania

- Exterior view of the Penn
- Interactive map of the Omni William Penn Hotel area
- Alternative names: The Grande Dame

General information
- Location: 530 William Penn Place, Pittsburgh, Pennsylvania
- Coordinates: 40.4406°N 79.9966°W
- Opening: March 9, 1916 (Annex added in 1929) (modernized 1984)
- Owner: Omni Hotels
- Operator: Omni Hotels

Technical details
- Floor count: 23

Design and construction
- Architects: Janssen & Abbott (1929 annex by Janssen & Cocken)
- Developer: Henry Clay Frick

Other information
- Number of rooms: 1600 in 1929; 602 presently
- Number of restaurants: 3
- Parking: Valet Parking

Website
- Omni Pittsburgh

Pittsburgh Landmark – PHLF
- Designated: 1972

The Omni William Penn Hotel is a 23 floor (3 underground) hotel located at 530 William Penn Place on Mellon Square in downtown Pittsburgh, Pennsylvania. A variety of luminaries have stayed at the hotel, including John F. Kennedy. The hotel staff innovated Lawrence Welk's now famous bubble machine, and it was the site of Bob Hope's marriage proposal in 1934. The hotel has won numerous awards including being named to the "Best of Weddings 2009" list by The Knot and receiving the Editor's Choice Award in the Business Hotels category on Suite101.com.

Omni William Penn Hotel, Pittsburgh is a member of Historic Hotels of America, the official program of the National Trust for Historic Preservation.

The hotel also features a restaurant that dates from 1916, the Terrace Room, featuring among other amenities a wall long mural entitled "The taking of Fort Pitt".

== History ==
Built from 1915 to 1916, the $6 million William Penn opened on March 11, 1916, in what newspapers hailed as the Grandest Hotel in the nation, its first night it hosted the annual Pittsburgh Chamber of Commerce Gala and was recorded as the largest gala in city history up to that time with U.S. Secretary of State Philander Knox hosting the event. The original hotel covered the western half of the block, facing Mellon Square.

It was listed on the National Register of Historic Places in 1985.

=== Ownership history ===
The hotel was bought from its original owners, the Pittsburgh Hotel Company, in 1928 by the Eppley Hotel Company. Eugene Eppley financed a major expansion in 1929, filling the remaining eastern half of the block, that made the William Penn the second largest hotel in the world. The expansion brought the number of rooms to 1600 and included an Art Deco ballroom atop the hotel conceived by noted designer Joseph Urban. However Eppley lost control of the hotel during the Great Depression and the new owners brought in Statler Hotels, which managed the hotel from 1940-1951.

Eppley regained controlling interest between 1950-1954, assuming management of the hotel back from Statler on January 1, 1952. The hotel's sale on June 4, 1956 from the Eppley Hotel Company to the Sheraton Corporation was part of the second largest hotel sale in United States history. The hotel was renamed the Penn-Sheraton Hotel.

Sheraton sold the hotel on May 22, 1968 to Nomarl, a group of local investors, for $7.75 million and the William Penn returned to its original name. With less demand for hotels in the city, Nomarl reduced the number of rooms from 1300 to 900, with the unused rooms turned to dorms for Duquesne University. Nomarl, in turn, sold the hotel to Alcoa in 1971.

In 1984, Alcoa brought in Westin Hotels to manage the hotel, which became the Westin William Penn, following $20 million in renovations which reduced the hotel from 840 to 650 rooms within the enormous building. Finally, the hotel was acquired by Omni Hotels & Resorts and was renamed Omni William Penn on January 31, 2001.

=== Events & notable guests ===
Among the major events that the hotel has hosted:

- November 10, 1921: A banquet in Marshal Foch's honor hosted by the governor and mayor.
- April 28, 1930: The Gideons International holds its 50th annual convention at the hotel, passing out over 500 bibles.
- October 2, 1930: The Institute of Transportation Engineers was formed in a meeting at the hotel.
- October 17, 1930: A Gala for the governors of the Pittsburgh Tri-State (Ohio, Pennsylvania and West Virginia) celebrated with speeches and presentations on the opening of the Lincoln Highway in their respective states.
- November 3, 1930: A statement from President Herbert Hoover is released at the gala celebrating the 10th anniversary of station KDKA and the world's radio industry.
- January to February, 1937: Count Basie and His Orchestra play the "Chatterbox." Live broadcast recorded and issued in 1974 by Jazz Archives Recordings (JA-16). First known recording of Basie band with Lester Young, Hershel Evans, Buck Clayton, et al.
- March 26, 1938: The formation of Point State Park and what would become the Pittsburgh Renaissance is announced in the ballroom to 600 invited local leaders and dignitaries.
- July 17, 1942: The United Steelworkers hold a major conference in response to wartime steel needs and accepted the 44 cents wage proposed by the War Labor Board.
- November 2, 1944: Address by Vice President Harry S Truman.
- January 15, 1948: Secretary of State and retired General of the Army and Army Chief of Staff, George C. Marshall delivers a nationally aired address to the 74th annual meeting of the Chamber of Commerce. He also made world news ending speculation that he would run for president.
- February 15, 1950: The first annual Pittsburgh Conference on Analytical Chemistry and Applied Spectroscopy is held in the hotel.
- December 6, 1954: 118 businesses, schools & hospitals, all 80 years or older, are honored at the Greater Pittsburgh Chamber of Commerce's 80th anniversary gala, hosted by William Block of the Post-Gazette's William Block & Scaife Co.'s Alan Scaife, the 2 oldest firms.
- October 8–9, 1956: Presidents Harry S Truman and Dwight D. Eisenhower both stay at the hotel in the heat of their campaigns as Eisenhower gives a major speech in the hotel's ballroom.
- November 1, 1956: Adlai Stevenson, Richard Nixon & Pat Nixon stay the night at the hotel.
- September 3–5, 1960: The 18th World Science Fiction Convention is held at the hotel.
- September 21, 1963: Lyndon B. Johnson hosts a major speech at the hotel and stays the night in the presidential suite.
- April 3, 1970: Zoo president Edward Magee addresses a Rotary conference along with Rani the 8-month-old elephant, 2 lambs, a snapping turtle, donkey, llama & eagle.
- October 26, 1976. President Ford participated in a Pittsburgh Economic Club question-and-answer session in the hotel's grand ballroom.
- September 3, 1980: Maureen Reagan on the campaign trail for her father, Ronald Reagan, who speaks at a fundraiser at the hotel.
- October 31, 1980: Ronald Reagan visits for a speech.
- April 5, 1984: Walter Mondale speaks at a reception held in his honor at the hotel.
- June 20–22, 1999: The 2nd annual International Trails & Greenways Conference.

From 1939 until the 1960s the hotel was the annual host for the region's Dapper Dan Sports Awards Banquet.

== Gallery ==
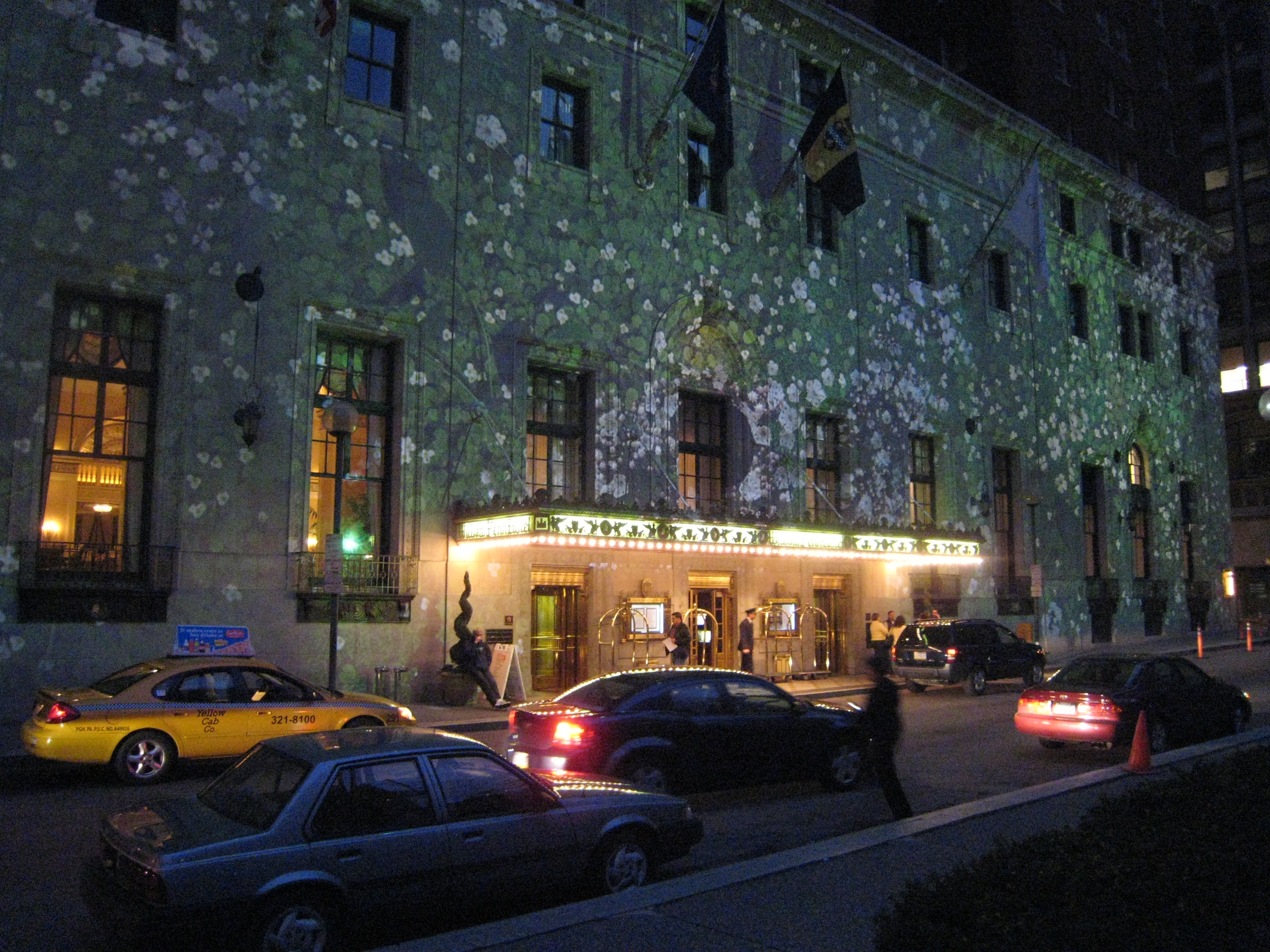
Exterior of the hotel during a light show in 2008

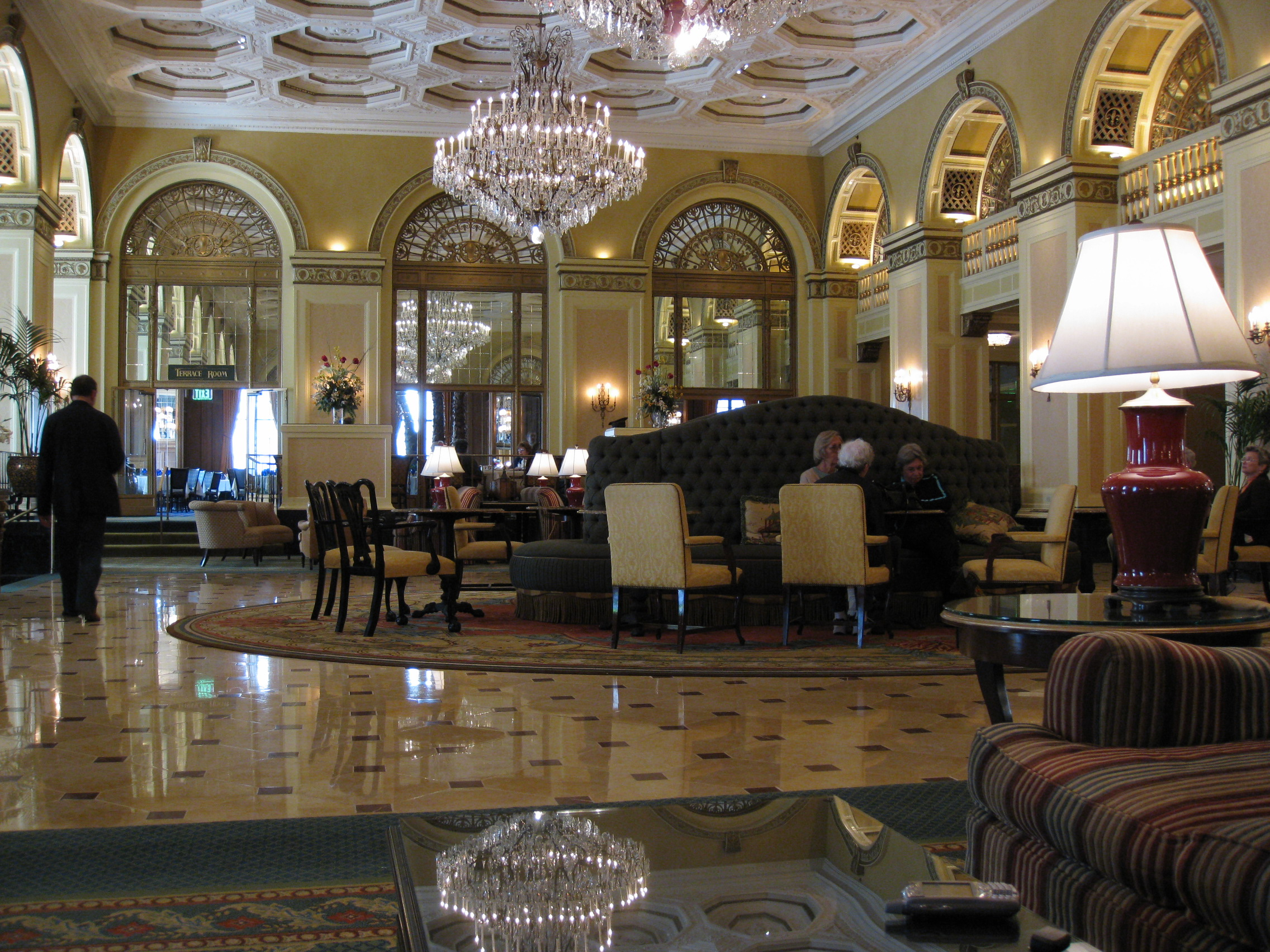
The lobby

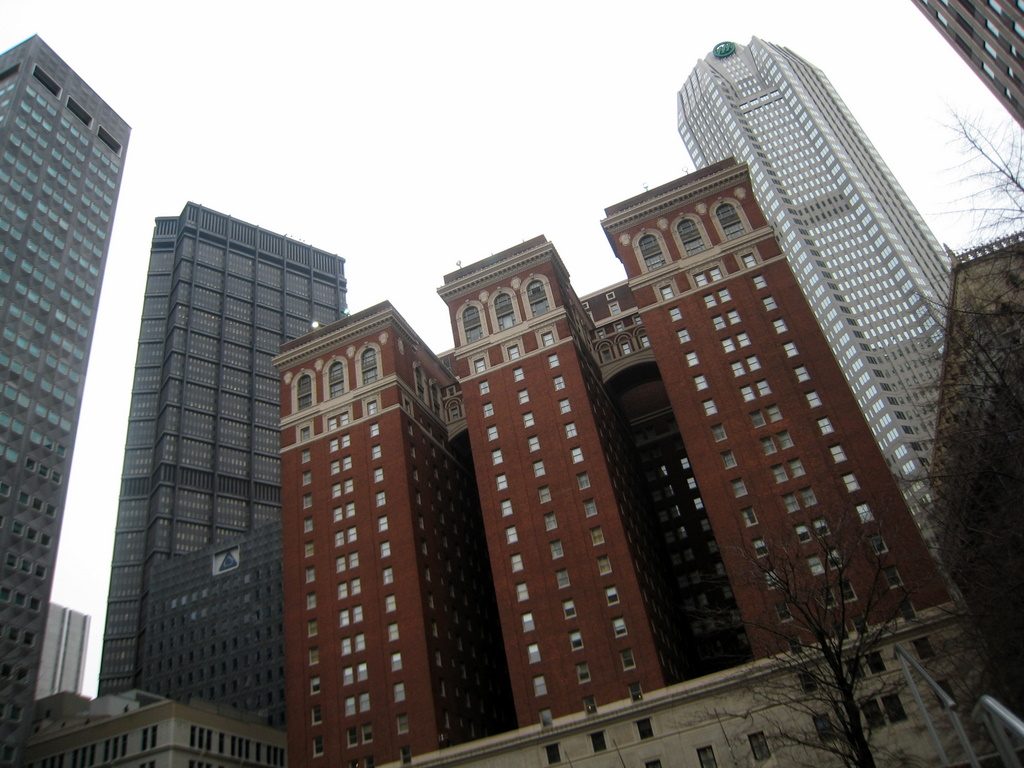
View of Omni William Penn Hotel from Mellon Square
