= Market Square (Pittsburgh) =

Public space located in Downtown Pittsburgh

Coordinates: 40°26′26″N 80°00′09″W

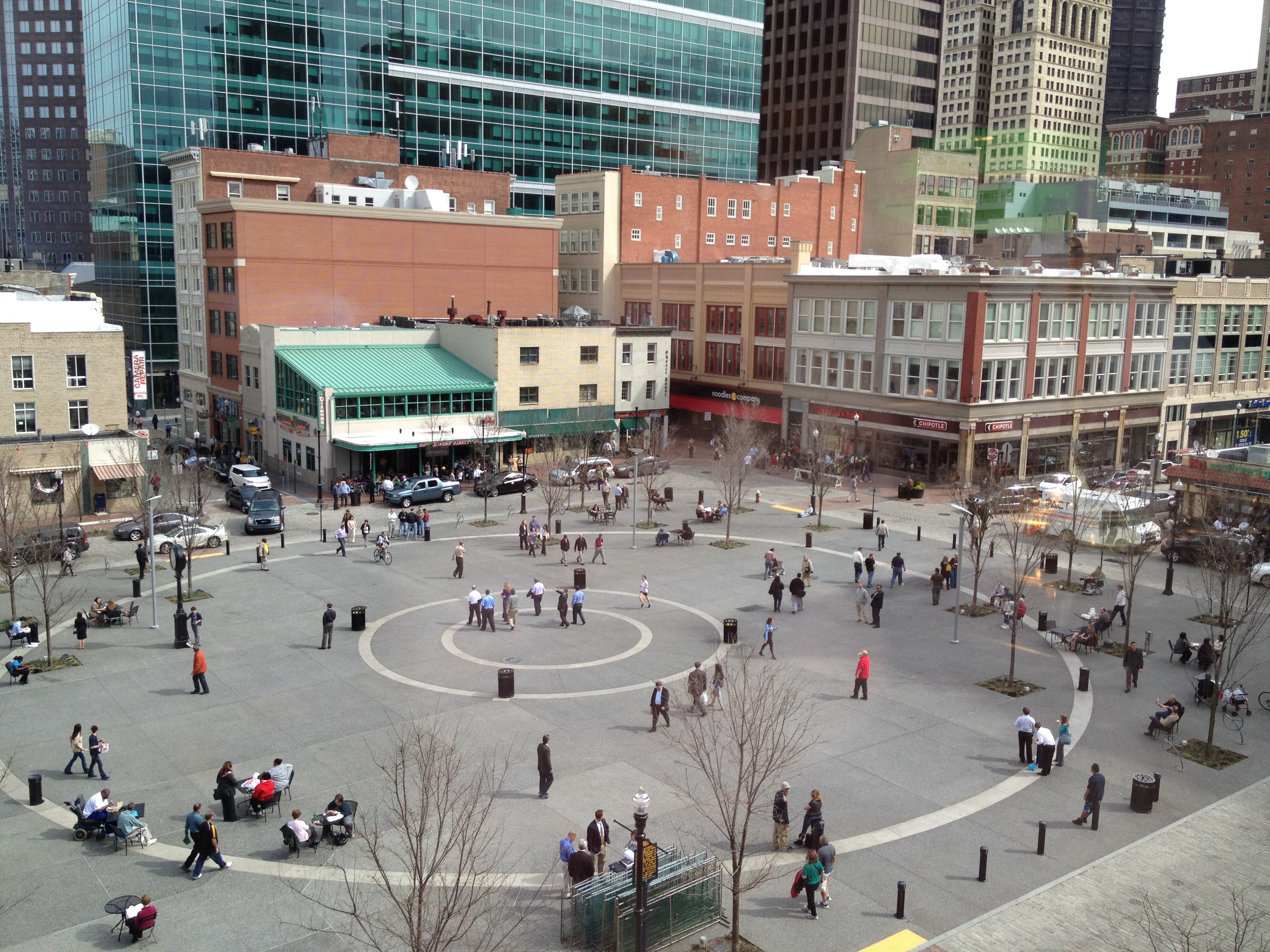
- Market Square

- Location within Pittsburgh
- Location: Market Square in Pittsburgh, Pennsylvania, USA

History
- Built: 1890s

Market Square is a public space located in Downtown Pittsburgh at the intersection of Forbes Avenue (originally named Diamond Alley in colonial times) and Market Street. The square was home to the first courthouse and first jail (both in 1795), and the first newspaper west of the Allegheny Mountains, the Pittsburgh Gazette (1786). A public/private modernization in the late 2000s has re-established the square as a social and cultural hub. A great number of restaurants, ranging from fast casual to fine dining, cafes and retailers occupy ground level buildings immediately facing the square, while housing units and offices occupy upper levels.

== History ==
George Woods and Thomas Vickroy, while creating the city block plan for streets in Pittsburgh's core, created Market Square in 1784. It was known originally as "Diamond Square" or "Diamond Market" for the Scotch-Irish idiom "Diamond" representing a public commons or square.

=== Seat of government ===
By the mid-1790s, the first Allegheny County Courthouse was constructed in Market Square. It was occupied until 1836 when construction was completed on a Grant Street complex several blocks away.

On December 7, 1818, the United States District Court for the Western District of Pennsylvania gaveled in its very first session at the square.

On July 8, 1794, the newly formed "borough" of Pittsburgh established a "Public Market House and Stalls" on the eastern half of the square. It also was the site of the original city hall for the borough and then city of Pittsburgh until May 22, 1872 when the second city hall opened at Oliver and Smithfield. The Courthouse was abandoned at the square in 1836 after the completion of a new county seat, and sold to private interests at auction on August 11, 1841.

=== Presbyterian Convention ===
On May 26, 1858 the city hall/courthouse was the host of the conference of Presbyterians that led to the merger forming the United Presbyterian Church of North America.

=== 20th Century ===
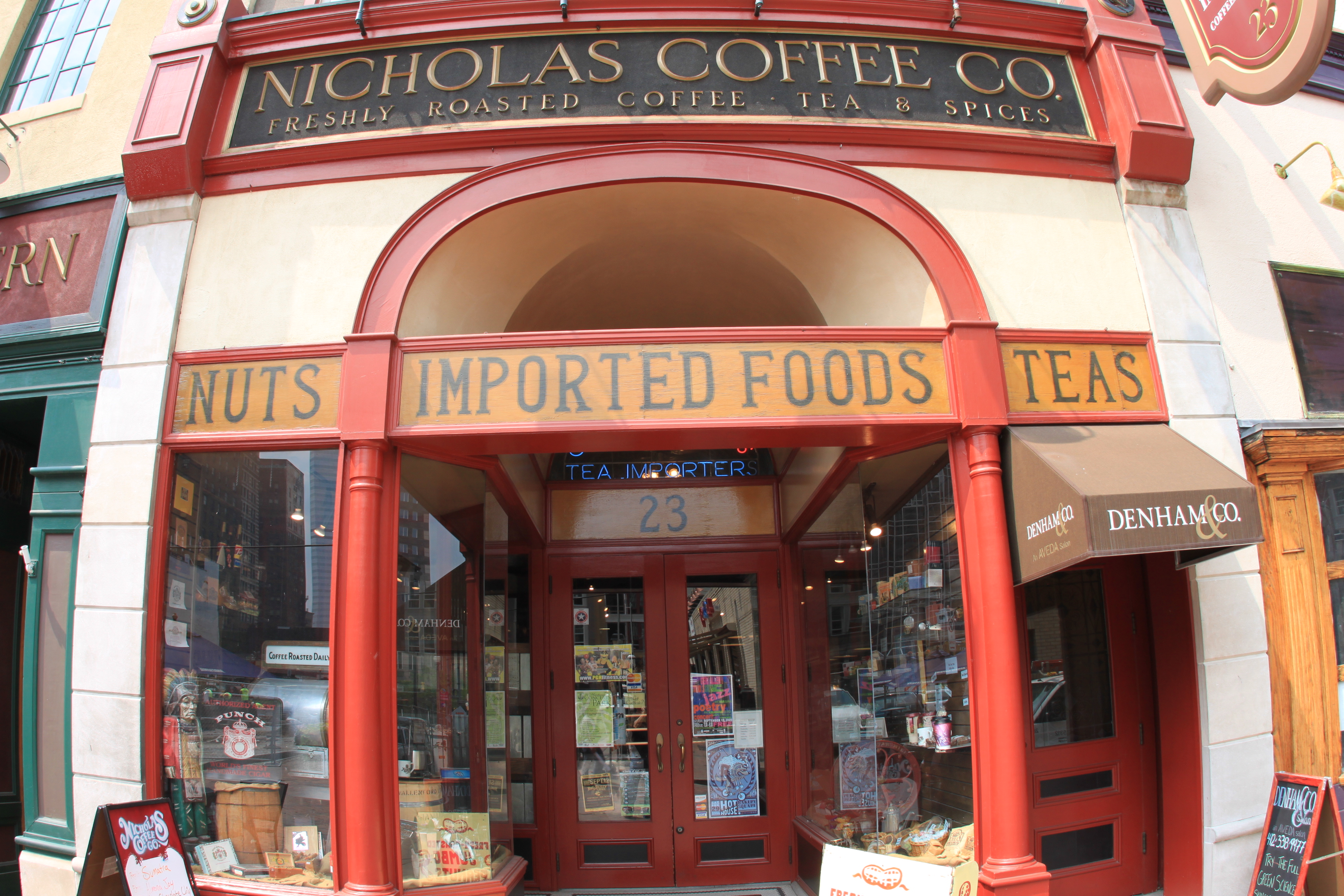
Nicholas Coffee Co. located in Market Square

Throughout the 19th and 20th centuries, Market Square provided a central location in the city, hosting much social and economic activity. By the mid-1970s, however, Market Square was in a state of decline resulting from increased traffic, crime and business closures. Preservationists and the city of Pittsburgh designated the area a historic landmark in an attempt to retain the square's crumbling architecture and style.

=== 21st Century ===
Major renovation work began in August 2009 to transform the square into a European-style piazza, completely reopening in late 2010. All vehicle traffic was diverted around the square to increase pedestrian-friendliness, and more outdoor seating was provided. Nearby, new apartments, condominiums and office space with ground-level retail have been fitted into historic buildings. Renovations accelerated growth of Market Square, and numerous restaurants opened in 2011, further increasing social activity within the square.

== Festivals and events ==
Market Square is a frequent location for local events and celebrations, including a farmers' market held every Thursday and a Christmas village. The square also holds many temporary non-repeating events; as an example, in the lead up to the reviving of an airline route between Pittsburgh International and London Heathrow, British Airways launched a promotional British-style telephone booth in the square where locals were able to enter raffles and competitions for free flights and other prizes.

== See also ==
- Mellon Square
