= Michigan State University School of Hospitality Business =

Coordinates: 42.723387°N 84.481366°W

School of Hospitality Business
- Type: Public
- Established: 1927
- Director: Dr. Karthik Namasivayam
- Undergraduates: 350
- Location: East Lansing, Michigan, USA
- Website: broad.msu.edu/hospitality-business/
- Logo

The School of Hospitality Business is a department-level school within the Eli Broad College of Business at Michigan State University.

Founded in 1927 as the nation's first business-based hotel training course, the School of Hospitality Business has 350 undergraduate students and 22 faculty members (endowed, tenured, and adjunct). The School of Hospitality Business is ranked #1 US Public Hospitality Business Program (College Choice, 2023); #2 US Public Program (the Edvocate, 2023); #3 Hospitality Management Degree Program (Successful Student, 2023); and #4 Hospitality Management Program in the World (CEO World, 2023). Students in the School can earn more than $300,000 each academic year in merit-based scholarships.

== History ==
MSU's School of Hospitality Business was founded in 1927 when the Education Committee of the Michigan Hotel Association met to discuss development of a college-level hotel management school, after which Michigan State approved a hotel training course. When classes started, there were 18 students majoring in the hotel training course.

In 1947, the W. K. Kellogg Foundation granted $1.4 million for construction of the Kellogg Hotel and Conference Center. That year, the program was also divided into three major areas of concentration: hotel management, restaurant management, and institutional management.

In 1951, Kellogg Center for Continuing Education was opened. The first general manager was Weldon Garrison, a 1946 graduate of The School of Hospitality Business. The school's offices were moved to the Kellogg Center, enrollment increased to approximately 300, and the Les Gourmets dinner-dance was founded as annual event.

In the 1960s, the Eppley Foundation granted the university $1.5 million to build the Eugene C. Eppley Center for Graduate Studies in Hotel, Restaurant and Institutional Management. The school is still housed in this building. The School became the first program in the country to offer a Master of Business Administration (MBA) degree in hotel, restaurant and institutional management, and enrollment reached 550.

In the 1980s, CAREER EXPO, the nation's leading hospitality career fair, was founded. Enrollment eclipsed 1,000. Dr. Ronald F. Cichy, an alumnus of the school, was appointed director of the school. The Visiting Distinguished Chefs Series was founded.

In the 1990s, the Hilton Lecture Series was founded, the school’s internship office was renamed the Student and Industry Resource Center (SIRC) and was endowed for $1 million, the First Annual Hospitality Association/Alumni Association Auction was held in the Kellogg Center, the Michael L. Minor Master of Science in Food Service Management was launched as a complement to the school’s MBA in hospitality business, and the Hospitality Association offered its first Vegas Night.

In the 2000s, the school became independent within the Eli Broad College of Business, the school's Alumni Association published 75th anniversary history book The Legacy of the Leader, the master's degree in hospitality business and the graduate specialization in hospitality business were launched, and faculty developed and launched the Hospitality Business Real Estate and Development Specialization for undergraduates.

In 2014, the school launched 12 mini-courses that will be only available online, such as "Introduction to Hospitality and Information Systems," "Private Club and Gaming Operations," and "Foodservice and Lodging Operations." "These mini-courses feature the same content found in the three full 8-week courses, enabling students to complete the same Management Certificate in the Business of Hospitality credential in smaller segments.

== Programs ==
The School of Hospitality Business offers the following programs:

- Bachelor of Arts (B.A.) in Hospitality Business
- Minor in Hospitality Business Real Estate

== Faculty ==
Among universities specifically with degree-granting hospitality programs, MSU was ranked ninth (or seventh among such universities in the United States), in terms of weighted-publication-count (2002-2006) in English-language research journals specific to the hospitality industry. The School’s faculty was ranked number one by the Journal of Hospitality & Tourism Research in “mean productivity” from 1992–2001, and in having "the most intensely" contributing authors amongst the Top 20 universities. In another study, reported on by the Journal of Hospitality & Tourism Education, a half dozen faculty members of The School of Hospitality Business were named among “Hospitality’s Most Influential Scholars.” The faculty also received the 2006 Richard J. Lewis Quality of Excellence Award for outstanding leadership.

Faculty include:

- Dr. Jeff Beck, an associate professor, and teaches courses in sales, event planning, and revenue management. His research interests include revenue management, sales management and ethics in hospitality.
- Dr. JaeMin Cha, an associate professor of foodservice management. Her research focuses on service climate in foodservice operations, sustainability, food safety, and emotional intelligence. Her collaborative handwashing study has been covered widely in the numerous media outlets.
- Dr. Seung Hyun Kim, an associate professor, teaching hospitality research. He specializes in hospitality marketing, research methods, and service leadership. His extensive research techniques come in part from his extensive international work experiences.
- Dr. Bonnie Knutson, an authority on consumer lifestyle and buying trends, strategic marketing, and marketing research. She is currently the editor of the Journal of Hospitality and Marketing, a national scholar of the National Advertising Foundation, a winner of the Golden Key Teaching Excellence Award, and the coveted Withrow Award for excellence in teaching and research.
- Dr. Lu Zhang, an associate professor, teaching information technology and hospitality business strategy courses. Her research focuses on two areas: hospitality information technology and marketing.

== Students ==
Students graduate with a business degree and develop leadership skills through two required internships, participation in nine student clubs, and three major annual events.

- Career Expo, one of the longest-running career fairs on campus. Hospitality companies attend this fall semester event to recruit students as interns and permanent employees.
- Destination Auction, fundraising event on behalf of the student Hospitality Association and The School's Alumni Association. A portion of the proceeds of proceeds are shared with a local charity.
- Les Gourmets, a black-tie (optional), seven-course reception and dinner each spring that showcases the talents of hundreds of students.

Undergraduate students have the opportunity to join the Spartan Sponsors Mentor Program, which pairs each student with an alumnus/a who shares the student's career interest to provide advice, knowledge, support and shared connections.

== See also ==
- Ranking of university programs in Hospitality Management
