= Eugene C. Eppley Administration Building =

University building in the United States

Coordinates: 41°15′32″N 96°00′26″W

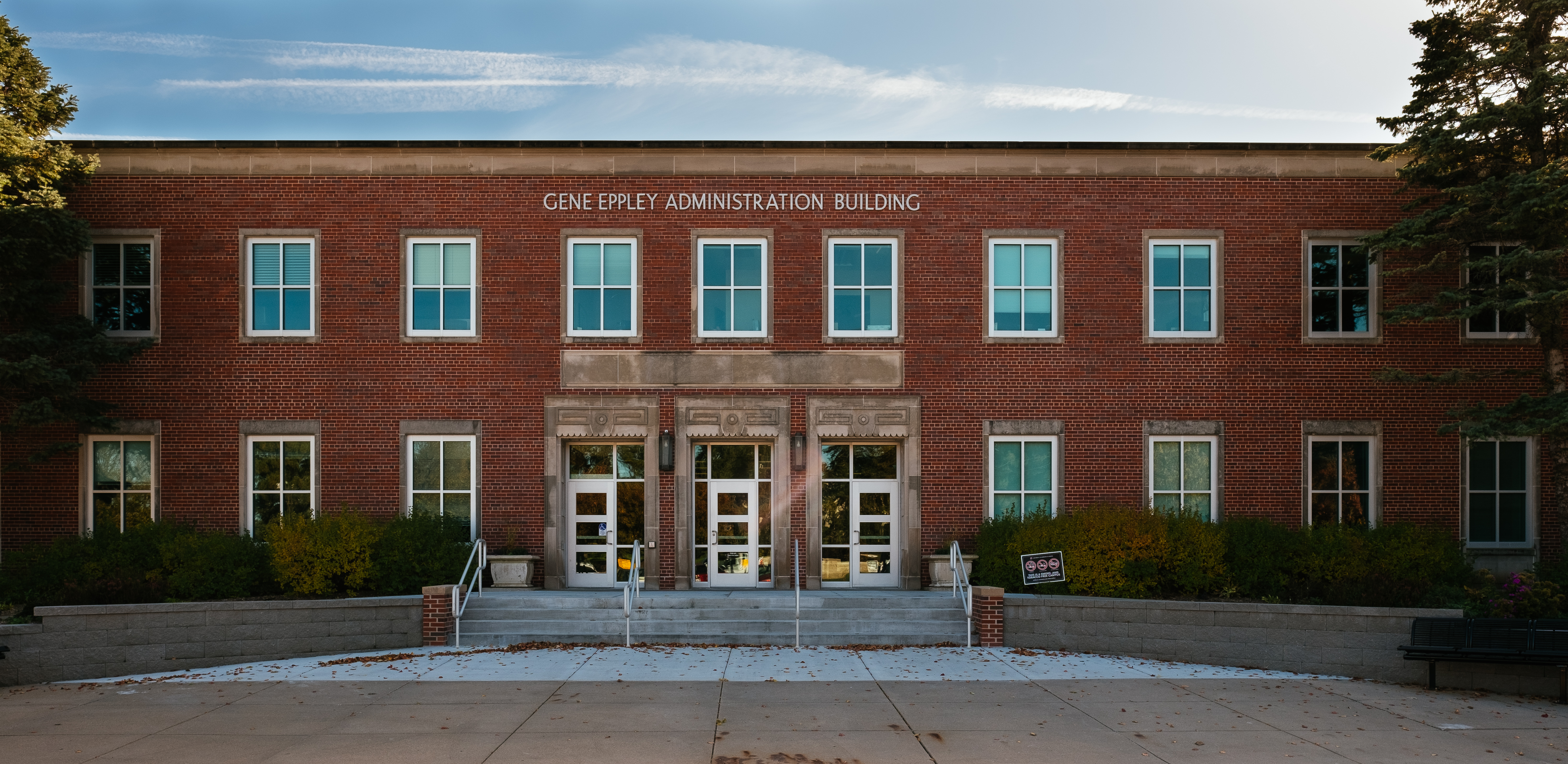
- Interactive map of the Eugene C. Eppley Administration Building area
- Former names: Eppley Library

General information
- Construction started: 1955
- Completed: February 5, 1956
- Owner: University of Nebraska at Omaha

Technical details
- Floor count: 2

Design and construction
- Architect: John Latenser, Sr.

The Eugene C. Eppley Administration Building is located on the University of Nebraska at Omaha north campus in Omaha, Nebraska.

== History ==
After attending an Omaha University football game with then-college president Milo Bail in 1949, Gene Eppley was asked what the growing university needed. Milo told him that a library was in order for their new campus, to which Eppley wrote a check for $850,000, the entire cost of the two-story structure. Seven years after his death in 1958, the Eppley Foundation donated $50,000 to assist the university's hiring of new professors, and in 1976 the original Eugene Eppley Library became the current Eppley Administration building. Eppley's gift and the building of the Eppley Administration Building is credited with accelerating the growth of Omaha University. Several buildings, including the student center and engineering buildings, were built soon after the opening of the Eppley Building. The overall growth of the university in the years after the building's dedication is attributed to the opening of the library, as well.
