= Dr. Frank W. Epley Office =

- Frank W. Epley Office
- U.S. National Register of Historic Places
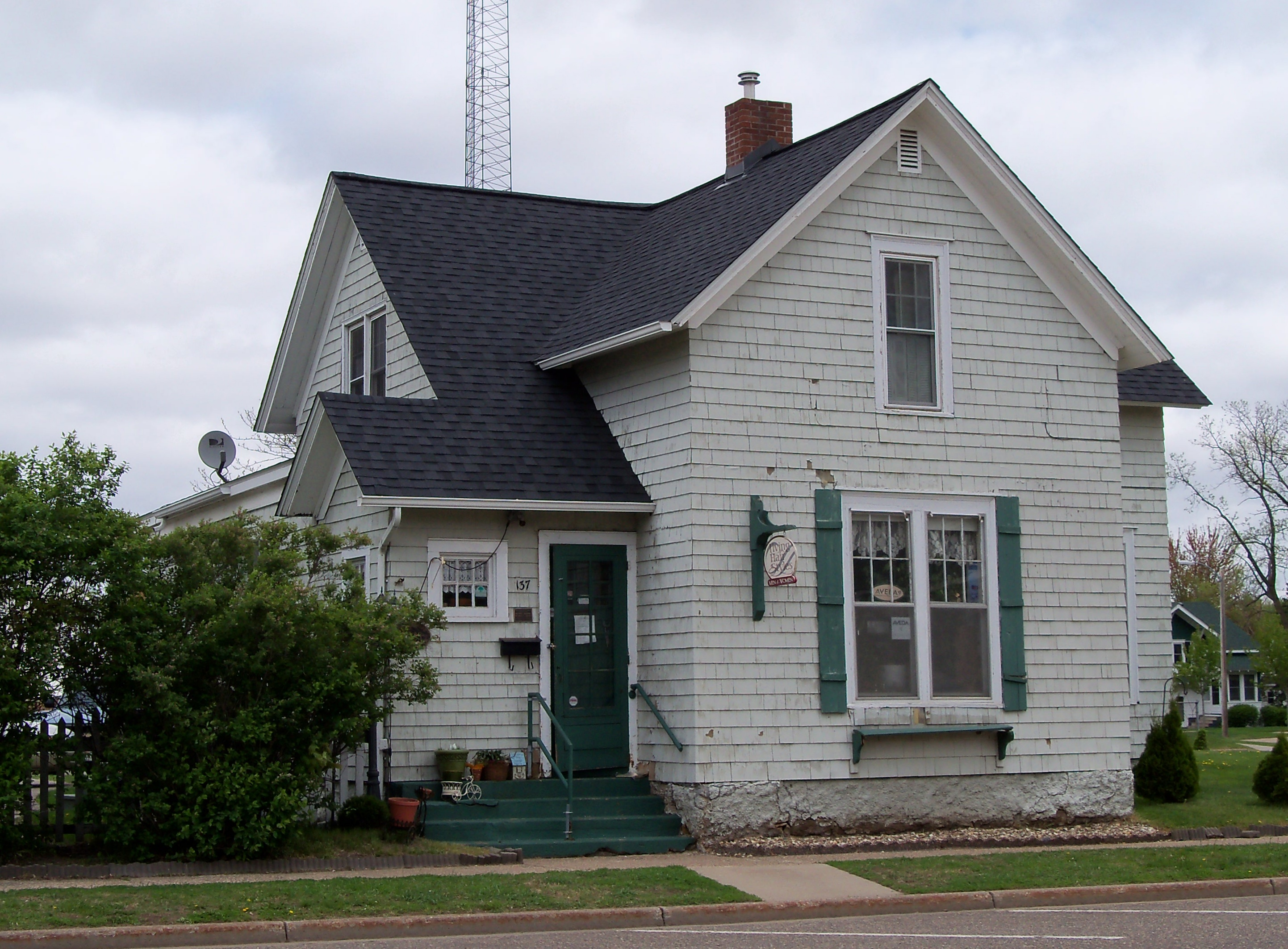
- Dr. Frank W. Epley Office
- Location: 137 Third St. New Richmond, Wisconsin
- Coordinates: 45.12061°N 92.5366°W
- Area: less than one acre
- Built: 1884
- MPS: New Richmond MRA
- NRHP reference No.: 88000617
- Added to NRHP: May 31, 1988

The Dr. Frank W. Epley Office is located in New Richmond, Wisconsin. It was added to the National Register of Historic Places in 1988.

It is a one-and-a-half-story T-shaped plan house with wood shingles.

It was associated with Dr. Frank W. Epley (1851-1908).
