= Eugene C. Eppley Center =

- Front facade of the Eppley Center
- Interactive map of the Eugene C. Eppley Center area

General information
- Type: Classroom and office building
- Location: East Lansing, Michigan
- Coordinates: 42.72663°N 84.47361°W
- Current tenants: Eli Broad College of Business, The School of Hospitality Business
- Construction started: 1961
- Completed: 1962
- Owner: Michigan State University

Technical details
- Floor count: 5 (ground + 4)

The Eugene C. Eppley Center is located on the Michigan State University campus in East Lansing, Michigan. It is home to a number of units within the Eli Broad College of Business, including the Department of Finance, the Full-Time Masters in Business Administration (MBA) Program offices, the MBA Career Services Center, the International Business Center (IBC)/Center for International Business Education and Research (CIBER), Multicultural Business Programs, the School of Hospitality Business, Undergraduate Academic Services, the financial analysis lab, the IBM On-Demand Supply Chain Laboratory, the Management Information Systems (MIS) Laboratory, the Team Effectiveness Teaching Laboratory, and the Lear Corporation Career Services Center.

== History ==
The Eugene C. Eppley Center was originally built in 1961 as the Eugene C. Eppley Center for Graduate Studies in Hotel, Restaurant and Institutional Management for "graduate training in the fields of hotel, restaurant and institutional management." Its benefactor and namesake was a hotel executive and philanthropist who was known as the largest individual hotel operator in the world, owning more than 20 hotels between 1915 and 1956. He died in 1958.

The Eppley Foundation granted the university $1.5 million to build the center. With Eppley's donation, the school became the first program in the country to offer a master of business administration degree in hotel, restaurant and institutional management, and enrollment reached 550.

In 1992, the North Business College Complex was built, connected to the Eppley Center.

In 1999, the Lear Corporation Career Services Center opened in the Eppley Center, providing undergraduate career planning and placement for students of all majors interested in careers in business. The Lear Center also houses the Union Pacific Media Studio and the Business Communication Center.

== Financial Analysis Lab ==
The Financial Analysis Laboratory is a suite in the Eppley Center equipped with operational dealing desks similar to those at most financial institutions and investment banks. High-speed personal computers with dual flat-screen monitors and data feeds simulate a variety of trading desks. Large plasma monitors in the Eppley Center entryway display financial information and a running ticker, with other television and computer monitors providing financial news feeds. In the future, the Financial Analysis Lab will provide insights into the field of investments and the activity of trading. Glass walls throughout the lab allow passersby to observe current financial information on the monitors. IBM is among the contributors to this suite.
