= Sioux City Art Center =

Art museum in Sioux City, Iowa, U.S.

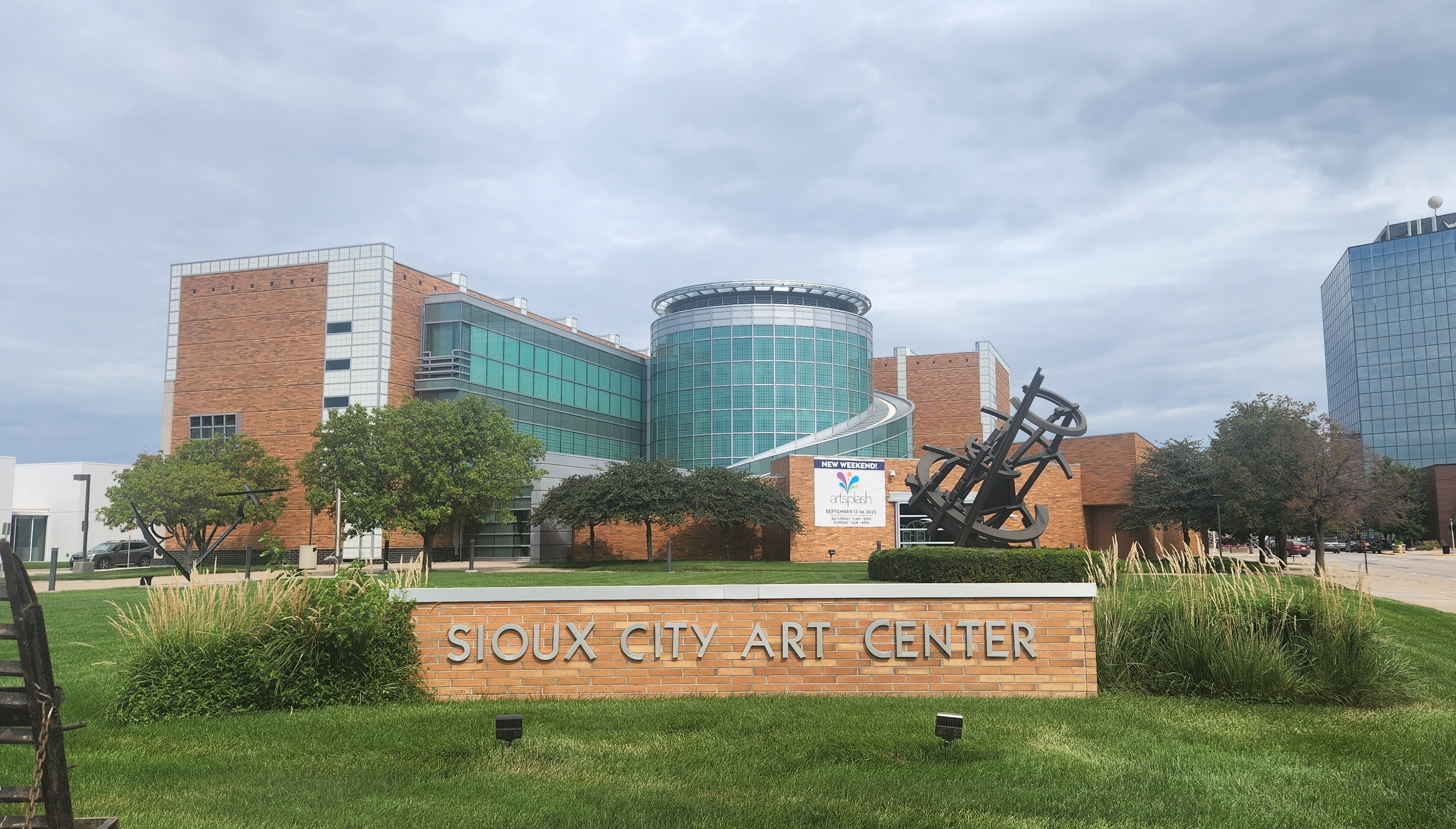
- Sioux City Art Center in 2025
- Established: 1937
- Location: 225 Nebraska Street, Sioux City, Iowa, U.S.
- Coordinates: 42.4928°N 96.404°W
- Type: Art museum
- Visitors: 35,000
- Website: www.siouxcityartcenter.org

The Sioux City Art Center is an art museum located in Sioux City, Iowa, United States. The museum includes many temporary exhibits and features a permanent gallery. The museum includes a total of over 1,200 artworks. It began as a Works Progress Administration (WPA) project in 1937 when the several organizations, and the federal government, helped fund the project. The art museum moved several times, from 613 Pierce Street from 1938 to 1954, to the former Commerce Building from 1954 to 1966, and the American Legion Club Building from 1966 to 1997. The museum moved into its current location in 1997.

== History ==
The Sioux City Art Center was announced in 1937 as a project of the Works Progress Administration, in partnership with the Sioux City Society of Fine Arts. The project had been in development since 1935. The federal government provided over $8,000 for the project. The center was originally located on 613 Pierce Street and officially opened in February 1938.

In 1954, it was announced that the art center would move to the fifth-floor of the Commerce Building in Downtown Sioux City. As a part of the move, the floor would be remodeled. The Commerce Building space was comparably smaller, but was expected to be an upgrade to the original space before. The new location of the Sioux City Art Center opened in March 1954.

In 1966, the center announced that it would be moving again. The new location would be in the former Sioux City American Legion Club Building. The building was built in 1914 and was located at 513 Nebraska Street. The building required little remodeling, compared to the previous buildings before. The location officially opened in April 1967. `In the early 1980s, the building underwent major renovations. While plans to build a new museum were discussed, due to the expensive cost of $5 million to build a replacement, plans were put on hold to renovate the building.

In 1993, the center announced that it would be building a new location in its now present location. Development of the new building originally began in 1986, but after encountering numerous delays, it wasn't until 1992 that official plans began. Ground for the new arts center was broken in 1994. Following three years of construction, the location officially opened in 1997.

In 2018, the Gilchrist Learning Center opened to the West side of the building. Named for the Gilchrist Foundation, the learning center was built for the museum for educational purposes. Later that same year, renovations were announced for the museum, which would allow for more artwork to be displayed in the building. Renovations were completed in 2019.

== Exhibitions ==
The Sioux City Art Center includes many temporary exhibitions, as well as a permanent collection. Most of the permanent collection consists of art made by artists from or around Sioux City. Many of the temporary exhibits include work from a national or an international level. The museum includes a total count of 1,200 artworks. The largest artwork in the permanent collection is the Corn Room mural, created in 1926 by Grant Wood.
