= Eppley Institute for Research in Cancer and Allied Diseases =

Research institute at the University of Nebraska Medical Center

The Eppley Institute for Research in Cancer and Allied Diseases is a research institute at the University of Nebraska Medical Center in Omaha, Nebraska, United States.

== History ==
Originally built with a grant from the Eugene C. Eppley Foundation, the Institute was founded in 1960 with support from the National Institutes of Health and the University of Nebraska Medical Center (UNMC). It was dedicated in 1963. Dr. Henry M. Lemon was the first director. In 1968, Dr. Philippe Shubik's research group moved to UNMC from the Chicago Medical School to continue their focus on the study of chemical carcinogenesis. The Eppley Institute became an independent research institute in 1972 with an act from the Nebraska Legislature. In 1973 the Institute grew by 30,000 feet with the addition of the Eppley Hall of Science, which was funded by the Eppley Foundation and the National Cancer Institute.

The American Cancer Society awarded the Eppley Institute a "Special Institutional Grant in Cancer Cause and Prevention" in 1988. This award is one of only seven such awards in the nation.

== Operations ==
The Eppley Institute's stated mission is to "Develop superior research programs that will provide a better understanding of the causes of cancer, improve the methods for diagnosis of cancer and improve the methods for the treatment and prevention of cancer and similar disorders".

The Eppley Institute is part of the University of Nebraska Medical Center and The Nebraska Medical Center. It has access to 734 beds and handles 22,000 inpatient admissions yearly for approximately 3,600 new cancer patients annually. 164 Cancer Center members, including 61 practicing physicians, are involved in basic, clinical, and population-based research and are awarded approximately $20 million in peer-reviewed research grants annually.

Eppley is recognized for its treatments of hematological malignancies, particularly lymphomas and leukemia. Its basic research programs include chemical carcinogenesis; molecular, cellular, and structural biology; and translational research in novel therapies. It is known for its work in the study of lymphoma, and Eppley's notability in the field of transplantation began with bone marrow transplantation in 1983.

The Cancer Research Doctoral Program at UNMC, funded by the National Cancer Institute T32 Cancer Biology Training Program, includes faculty who have primary appointments at the Eppley Institute.

== See also ==
- Hospitals in Omaha, Nebraska
- Colleges and universities in Omaha, Nebraska
