= Eli Broad College of Business =

Business school of Michigan State University

Coordinates: 42.723387°N 84.481366°W

- Type: Public
- Established: 1953
- Dean: David Souder
- Faculty: 134
- Undergraduates: 6,224
- Postgraduates: 954
- Location: East Lansing, Michigan, United States
- Mission: "We create and disseminate knowledge through collaborative relationships while developing transformational leaders who make business happen."
- Website: broad.msu.edu

The Eli Broad College of Business is the business college at Michigan State University. The college has programs in accounting, finance, human resource management, management, marketing, supply chain management, and hospitality business, which is an independent, industry-specific school within the Broad College (The School of Hospitality Business). This independent, industry-specific school has 800 admitted undergraduate students and 36 graduate students not included in the college's totals.

Eli Broad, an alumnus of Michigan State, endowed the college in 1991, donating $20 million.

The college has been accredited by the Association to Advance Collegiate Schools of Business (AACSB) since 1953.

The University of Texas-Dallas's Top 100 Business School Research Rankings lists the Broad College as #30 in North America and #33 worldwide in research contributions to the 24 leading business journals it tracks.

== Campus ==
The Eli Broad College of Business is located on the campus of Michigan State University and consists of three buildings: The Edward J. Minskoff Pavilion, Eugene C. Eppley Center, and North Business Building. Inside the Minskoff Pavilion is the Deloitte Foundation Interview Suite and the Russell Palmer Career Management Center. The William C. Gast Business Library is across the street in the College of Law building.

The Weekend Master of Business Administration (MBA) program and executive development programs are held at the James B. Henry Center for Executive Development in Lansing, Michigan, and the Management Education Center in Troy, Michigan.

== Degree programs ==
Business school rankings

U.S. MBA Rankings
- Bloomberg (2025): 45
- U.S. News & World Report (2026): 35

Global MBA Rankings
- FT (2026): 43

=== Undergraduate degrees ===
Broad offers undergraduate degrees in accounting, finance, hospitality business, human resource management, management, marketing, and supply chain management. The supply chain management major is currently ranked number one by the U.S. News & World Report. High school students who select a Broad major on the MSU Freshman application are considered for direct admission. Current undergraduate MSU students can apply to the Broad College through the secondary admission process. Applicants must fulfill specific academic and non-academic requirements as part of the application.

Undergraduate specializations include entrepreneurship, environmental studies, hospitality business real estate & development, information technology, sales communication, and sustainability. There is also a minor available in international business.

Undergraduate programs were ranked 42nd in the country by Businessweek in 2014 and 21st by U.S. News & World Report in their 2015 Best Undergraduate Business Programs rankings, published in 2014.

=== Online and Hybrid Programs ===
In 2011, Michigan State University initiated online certificate programs in supply chain management, hospitality management and strategic leadership through the Broad College. In 2012 and 2013, online programs expanded to include eight certificates in supply chain management, four in strategic leadership and two in hospitality management.

Eli Broad College of Business offers online for-credit graduate certificates in human resource management, leadership and strategic management. Additionally, Broad offers an online master of science degree in management, strategy and leadership and an MS in supply chain management. The supply chain degree is in a blended format that includes online and on-campus sessions.

=== MBA programs ===
The Broad College has offered MBA programs since 1960.

Its Full-Time MBA program is 21 months in duration and is for those with at least 2 years of work experience. The average admitted student has four years of work experience. The program was ranked 27th in the nation and 14th among public institutions by Businessweek in 2016, 58th in the world by Financial Times in 2016, and 22nd in the nation by Forbes in 2016.

Its Weekend MBA program lasts 19 months and is for working professionals with significant experience. Classes are held every other Saturday and one Friday evening per month. This program was ranked 46th by Economist 2015 Executive MBA Ranking. In 2015, the program was ranked 72nd globally by Financial Times Executive MBA Ranking.

=== Other Master's Degree Programs ===
- Master of Science in Accounting
- Master of Science in Business Data Science & Analytics
- Master of Science in Customer Experience Management
- Master of Science in Finance
- Master of Science in Financial Planning and Wealth Management
- Master of Science in Hospitality Business Management
- Master of Science in Marketing Research
- Master of Science in Management, Strategy and Leadership
- Master of Science in Supply Chain Management
- Michael L. Minor Master of Science in Food Service Business Management

=== Doctoral programs ===
- Accounting
- Finance
- Information Technology Management
- Logistics
- Marketing
- Strategic Management
- Operations and Sourcing Management
- Organizational Behavior

== Research Centers ==
The Center for Leadership of the Digital Enterprise (CLODE) provides an intellectual infrastructure of research projects, databases and case studies with a keen focus on the strategic needs of an innovative corporation.

The Institute for Entrepreneurship advances and promotes entrepreneurship at Michigan State University and in the state of Michigan through research, education, and outreach. Operating under IE, the Demmer Center for Business Transformation (DCBT) was established through a gift from the Demmer family, to help Michigan companies transform into strategic, lean competitors by providing education, “hands-on” engagement, and thought leadership. Since its establishment in 2008, the Demmer Center has been assisting Michigan manufacturing businesses in transforming and increasing their presence and profitability in domestic as well as global markets.

The Center for Global Sustainability focuses on developing and disseminating knowledge associated with the key sustainability dimensions of economic, environment, ethics, and education.

The International Business Center (IBC) was designated as a Center for International Business Education and Research (CIBER), a type of U.S. Department of Education designation as a National Resource Center, in 1990. The center provides education, research, and assistance on issues of importance to international trade and global competitiveness. It is the headquarters of the Academy of International Business and developed the globalEDGE research tool.

== Notable people ==
=== Alumni ===
- Eli Broad - Billionaire and Founder
- Drayton McLane - Billionaire and Founder
- Yousif Ghafari - former United States Ambassador to Slovenia
- Scott DeRue - Dean and Professor at Ross School of Business
- Bob Chapek - former CEO of The Walt Disney Company
- Robert Stempel - former chairman and CEO of General Motors Corporation
- Priya Balasubramaniam - Vice President at Apple Inc.
- Craig Menear - Chairman and CEO of The Home Depot
- John H. McConnell - Owner of Columbus Blue Jackets NHL
- JR Shaw - Founder of Shaw Communications
- Montie Brewer - former CEO and President of Air Canada
- William Cunningham- 24th President of University of Texas at Austin

=== Faculty ===
- Vallabh Sambamurthy - former Chair and Professor

== See also ==
- List of United States business school rankings
- List of business schools in the United States
