= Eugene C. Eppley Fine Arts Building =

Coordinates: 42.473°N 96.3607°W

- Interactive map of the Eugene C. Eppley Fine Arts Building area

General information
- Type: Performance hall and classrooms
- Location: Sioux City, Iowa
- Construction started: 1966
- Completed: 1966
- Owner: Morningside College

Design and construction
- Architects: W.L. Beuttler and Son
- Main contractor: Chris Hansen Construction

The Eugene C. Eppley Fine Arts Building is located on the Morningside College campus in Sioux City, Iowa. Built in 1966, it is regarded as "one of the finest music and arts facilities in the Midwest." The auditorium seats 1,400 and is noted for its acoustical qualities and the majestic Sanford Memorial Organ. The Helen Levitt Art Gallery is also located inside the building. The Sioux City Symphony Orchestra has used the Eppley for concerts since its opening.

== History ==
The Eppley Fine Arts Building was built in 1966 by Chris Hansen Construction from designs by a local architectural firm called W.L. Beuttler and Son. Featuring a steel frame, brick, block, glazed tile, and stone masonry, cement and acoustical plaster and ceramic mosaic tile, the building was constructed for long term usage. A ceramic mosaic is situated at the main entrance.
