= Heider College of Business =

Creighton University Heider College of Business
- Established: 1920
- Dean: Anthony Hendrickson
- Students: 6,339
- Location: Harper Center; Omaha, Nebraska, United States; 41°15′55″N 95°56′35″W
- Website: www.creighton.edu/business/

The Heider College of Business (formerly known as the Creighton University College of Business) is the business school at Creighton University in Omaha, Nebraska, United States. Opened in 1920, it offers degrees in accounting, economics, finance, international business, marketing, management, and business intelligence and analytics. The Heider College of Business was named #2 for Return on Investment for Business Schools, as rated by Payscale.com in 2013. The Heider College of Business is located in the Harper Center building on Creighton's campus. It is accredited by the Association to Advance Collegiate Schools of Business.

An average of 400 graduate students annually complete degrees in Master of Business Administration, Master of Science in Business Intelligence and Analytics, and Master of Science in Investment Management and Financial Analysis. The dean of the Heider College of Business is Anthony Hendrickson.

The Creighton University College of Business was renamed to the Heider College of Business on October 23, 2013 to acknowledge donations from Charles F. Heider and Mary C. Heider of Omaha. This made the college the first named school at Creighton University.
