= Sports in Pittsburgh =

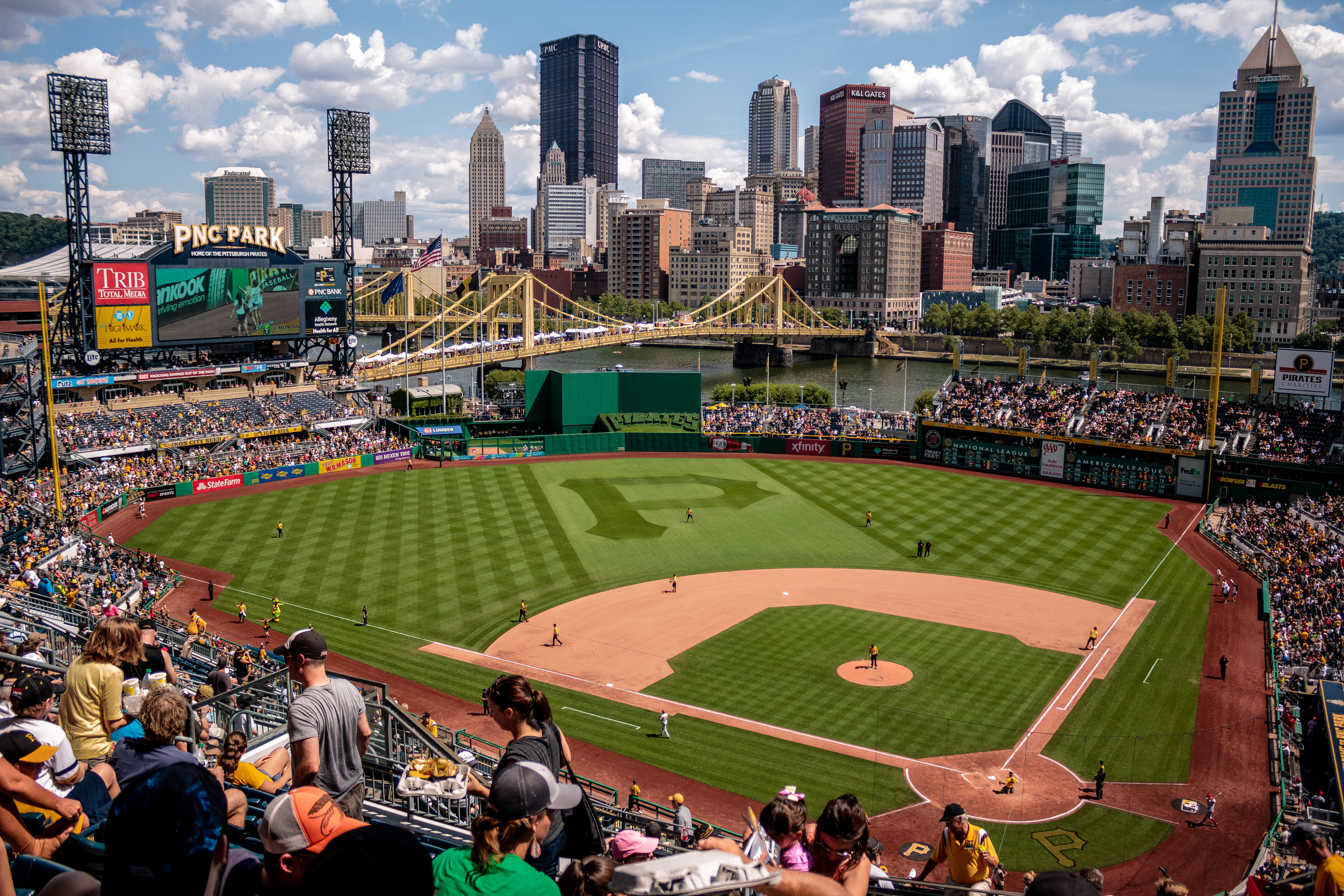
As the home of MLB's Pittsburgh Pirates baseball team, PNC Park is located in North Shore, in front of the Allegheny River, Roberto Clemente Bridge, and the Pittsburgh city skyline.

Sports in Pittsburgh have been played dating back to the American Civil War. Baseball, hockey, and the first professional American football game had been played in the city by 1892. Pittsburgh was first dubbed the "City of Champions" when the Pittsburgh Pirates, Pittsburgh Steelers, and Pittsburgh Panthers football team won multiple championships in the 1970s. Today, the city has three major professional sports franchises, the Pirates, Steelers, and Penguins; while the University of Pittsburgh's Panthers compete in NCAA Division I. Local universities Duquesne and Robert Morris also field Division I teams.

Pittsburgh's major teams have seen great success, with MLB's Pirates winning five World Series titles, the NHL's Penguins winning five Stanley Cups, and the NFL's Steelers winning a tied league record six Super Bowls. The Pittsburgh Panthers have also been successful in the NCAA with nine national championships in football and two in basketball.

The flag of Pittsburgh is colored with black and gold, based on the colors of William Pitt's coat of arms; Pittsburgh is the only city in the United States in which all professional sporting teams share the same colors. The city's first National Hockey League (NHL) franchise, the Pittsburgh Pirates, and that team's non-NHL predecessor, the Pittsburgh Yellow Jackets, wore black and gold as their colors in the 1920s. The colors were adopted by the founder of the Pittsburgh Steelers, Art Rooney, in 1933. In 1948, the Pittsburgh baseball Pirates switched their colors from red and blue to black and gold. Pittsburgh's second NHL franchise, the Pittsburgh Penguins, wore blue and white, due to then-general manager Jack Riley's upbringing in Ontario. In 1979, after the Steelers and Pirates had each won their respective league championships, the Penguins altered their color scheme to match, despite objections from the Boston Bruins, who have used the black and gold combination since the 1935–36 NHL season.

In 1975, late Steelers radio broadcaster Myron Cope invented the Terrible Towel, which has become "arguably the best-known fan symbol of any major pro sports team". Cope was one of multiple sports figures born in Pittsburgh and its surrounding area; others include golfer Arnold Palmer, Olympian and retired professional wrestler Kurt Angle, and basketball player Jack Twyman. Pittsburgh is also sometimes called the "Cradle of Quarterbacks" due to the number of prominent players of that position who hail from the area, including NFL greats Jim Kelly, George Blanda, Johnny Unitas, Joe Namath, Dan Marino, and Joe Montana.

The hometown Pittsburgh Penguins NHL ice hockey team defeats the Washington Capitals in game seven of the 2017 Stanley Cup playoffs second round en route to winning the Stanley Cup championship two rounds later. As of 2024, this is the most recent major league sports championship won by a Pittsburgh team.

== Professional team sports ==
The city of Pittsburgh has had various professional sports franchises throughout its history and today is home to three teams competing at the highest professional level in their respective sports: the Pittsburgh Pirates of MLB, the Pittsburgh Steelers of the NFL, and the Pittsburgh Penguins of the NHL.

=== Major league professional teams ===
Franchise	Founded	Sport	Current venue	League	Championships
Pittsburgh Pirates	1882	Baseball	PNC Park	Major League Baseball	5 World Series
Pittsburgh Steelers	1933	American football	Acrisure Stadium	National Football League	6 Super Bowls
Pittsburgh Penguins	1967	Ice hockey	PPG Paints Arena	National Hockey League	5 Stanley Cups

=== Minor league professional teams ===
Franchise	Founded	Sport	Current venue	League	Championships
Pittsburgh Riverhounds SC	1999	Soccer	F.N.B. Stadium	USL Championship	1 USLC Championship
Pittsburgh Passion	2003	Women's American football	Mihalik-Thompson Stadium	Women's Football Alliance	3 Women's Football Championships
Steel City Yellow Jackets	2014	Basketball	A Giving Heart Community Center	American Basketball Association	1 ABA Championship
Pittsburgh Thunderbirds	2015	Ultimate	F.N.B. Stadium	Ultimate Frisbee Association	
Steel City Queens	2018	Women's basketball	A Giving Heart Community Center	Women's American Basketball Association	
Pittsburgh Steeltoes	2023	Rugby sevens		Premier Rugby Sevens	
Bridge City FC	2025	Indoor soccer	Sewickley Sports Arena	Major League Indoor Soccer	

=== Top tier amateur teams ===
Franchise	Founded	Sport	Current venue	League	Championships
Steel City FC (Men)	2019	Soccer	Founders Field	USL League Two	
Steel City FC (Women)	2015	Women's soccer	Founders Field	USL W League	
Pittsburgh Riveters SC	2024	Women's soccer	F.N.B. Stadium	USL W League	
Pittsburgh Riverhounds 2	2025	Soccer	F.N.B. Stadium	USL League Two	

=== Baseball ===
We had 'em all the way

— Pirates broadcaster Bob Prince, after a comeback

Prior to 1876, there were three amateur Pittsburgh baseball teams — the Enterprise, the Xanthas, and the Olympics — playing most often at Recreation Park. On April 15, 1876, Recreation Park was the site of a game between the Xanthas and the Pittsburgh Alleghenies (alternately spelled "Alleghenys"), an unrelated forerunner to the "Alleghenys" team which would later be renamed the Pirates. The Alleghenies won the game 7–3. The 1877 squad was the most successful yet, finishing within 1 game of the pennant in the International Association; only a Canadian team had a better record, allowing the city potential bragging rights for being the best American team that season.

1882 marked the first "major league" and fully professional season for the Pittsburgh Alleghenies (Pirates) and in 1887, the Alleghenies moved from American Association to the National League after owner William Nimick became frustrated over a contract dispute. The Pirates were purchased in 1900 by Barney Dreyfuss, who would go down in history as the "Father of the modern World Series" and its precursor, the Chronicle-Telegraph Cup, both of which saw the Pirates participate in the inaugural series. He recruited Hall of Famers Fred Clarke and Pittsburgh native Honus Wagner and built the first concrete and steel (first "modern") baseball stadium, Forbes Field. Under Dreyfuss, the Pirates won pre-World Series world titles in 1901 and 1902, National League pennants from 1901 to 1903, 1909, 1925 and 1927 and World Series in 1909 and 1925. The 1902 squad set major league records for winning percentage and even today is the second most winning team ever fielded in the sport. The franchise won the World Series three more times— in 1960, 1971, and 1979. In 1960, the team became the first to win a World Series on a walk-off home run, hit by Bill Mazeroski, and they remain the only team to win on a walk-off homer in the decisive seventh game. In 1979, the Pirates repeated the accomplishment of their own 1925 World Series team, coming back from a three-games-to-one deficit, winning three games in a row when facing elimination, for the title. Thus the Pirates became (and they currently remain) the only franchise in the history of all sports to win world titles more than once when coming back from a 3–1 deficit. The 1979 Pirates also are unique in that they are the only team in all sports to have players who captured all four MVP awards: Seasonal (Willie Stargell, co-MVP with Keith Hernandez), All Star Game (Dave Parker), NLCS (Willie Stargell), and World Series (Willie Stargell) within a single season. Since 1970 the team has won their division and qualified for the playoffs nine times: six in the 1970s, and three times in a row from 1990 to 1992. Pirate players have won the league MVP award in 1960 (Dick Groat), 1966 (Roberto Clemente), 1978 (Dave Parker), 1979 (Willie Stargell), 1990 (Barry Bonds), 1992 (Barry Bonds), and 2013 (Andrew McCutchen) and the Cy Young Award in 1960 (Vernon Law) and 1990 (Doug Drabek). In 2001, the team opened PNC Park on the city's North Shore, regularly ranked as one of the top three baseball parks in the country.

In addition to the Pirates, the Pittsburgh Stogies, Pittsburgh Burghers and Pittsburgh Rebels played in various leagues from 1884 to 1915. The Rebels won the pennant in 1912 and finished just a half game shy of a pennant in 1915. The Pittsburgh Keystones, Homestead Grays (playing in the city limits), and Pittsburgh Crawfords played in the Negro leagues. With players including Josh Gibson and Cumberland Posey the Grays won 12 league titles—the most by any Negro league team—including nine consecutive from 1937 to 1945. The Crawfords finished their eight-year existence with a .633 winning percentage, with a line-up including Gibson, Cool Papa Bell, and Satchel Paige and claimed four straight league titles from 1933 until 1936, with the 1935 team judged by some as the greatest one to ever take the field in the Negro leagues, or perhaps in baseball period. Just as they initially played in the first "modern" ballpark in the majors (Forbes Field), Crawfords owner Gus Greenlee constructed the first steel and concrete "modern" stadium in the Negro leagues, with Greenlee Field opening in the Hill District on April 29, 1932.

=== Basketball ===
Pittsburgh South Side won Western Pennsylvania Basketball League and Central Basketball League titles in 1904, 1907 and 1913, coming in second place in 1908, 1911 and 1915. The "Black Fives" league enjoyed success in the city with Monticello-Loendi winning national championships in 1912, and four in a row from 1920 to 1923. The Pittsburgh Pirates from 1937 to 1939 and Pittsburgh Raiders in 1944–45 continued professional basketball in the city in the National Basketball League. Pittsburgh had one of the founding members of what became the NBA, the Pittsburgh Ironmen however only played a single season 1947–48 before folding. The Pittsburgh Renaissance (or Rens) played from 1961 until 1963 in the ABL, posting the city's best record in almost 40 years when they finished second in 1962.

The most lasting legacy of pro roundball in Pittsburgh was the Pittsburgh Pipers-Pittsburgh Condors of the American Basketball Association from 1967 until 1972. In the first ABA World Championship in 1968, the Pipers defeated the New Orleans Buccaneers, which were owned by Harry Connick Sr.

After the ABA Pipers/Condors folded in 1972 the city hosted the Pittsburgh Piranhas of the CBA in the mid-1990s. The franchise made it to the championship round in the 1994–95 season. Taking the series into the 6th game the Piranhas lost by a basket (92–94) in the final seconds of the game from what they claimed was an ineligible player, and the CBA denied a replay game in what would have been Pittsburgh's second pro basketball world title. In the late 2000s the Pittsburgh Xplosion, a development league team owned by former NBA player Freddie Lewis, played in a revamped ABA/CBA at Mellon Arena and the Petersen Events Center before ceasing operations prior to the 2008–09 season because of the economic recession. Another professional basketball team, the Pittsburgh Phantoms of the American Basketball Association, played during the 2009–10 season and held their games at the Carnegie Library of Homestead, but folded prior to the following season.

Pittsburgh has hosted dozens of pre-season and 15 regular season "neutral site" NBA games, including Wilt Chamberlain's record setting performance in both consecutive field goals and field goal percentage on February 24, 1967, NBA records that still stand.

=== Hockey ===
First played in Pittsburgh in 1895, ice hockey grew in popularity after the Duquesne Garden opened in 1899. In 1901 the Western Pennsylvania Hockey League (WPHL), a semi-professional ice hockey league based in Pittsburgh in the early 1900s, may have been involved in the first trade involving professional hockey players. In 1907, the WPHL was the first league to openly hire hockey players. The league played its games in three Pittsburgh hockey arenas, the Gardens, the Schenley Park Casino and the Winter Garden at Exposition Hall. The Casino, which was destroyed by a fire in 1896, had the first artificial ice surface in North America, was the first place in Pittsburgh where organized ice hockey was played and had the most modern indoor lighting system of the time era, that consisted of 1,500 incandescent lamps, 11 arc lights and 4 white calcium lights. In 1905–1907, the city was represented in the International Professional Hockey League, the first fully professional hockey league, by the Pittsburgh Professionals.

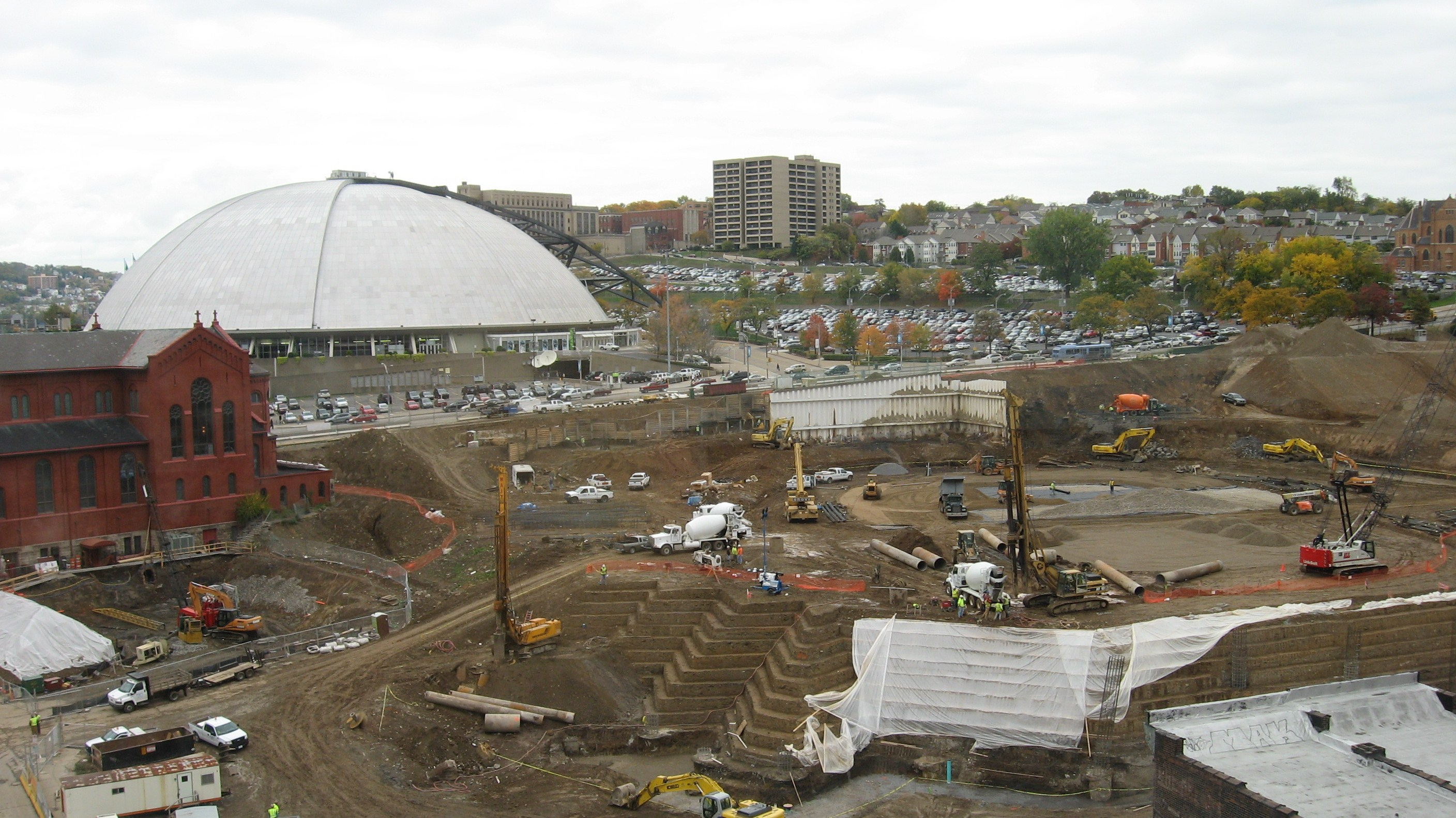
Pittsburgh Civic Arena was replaced by the venue now known as PPG Paints Arena in 2010.

The Gardens housed the largest indoor rink in the world and was home to the city's first NHL franchise, the Pittsburgh Pirates, from 1925 to 1930. The Gardens also was home to the Pittsburgh Shamrocks and the Pittsburgh Yellow Jackets of the International Hockey League as well as the Pittsburgh Hornets of the American Hockey League.

In 1961, Pittsburgh Civic Arena was constructed for use of the Pittsburgh Civic Light Opera. Founded, by Jack McGregor and Peter Block as part of the 1967 NHL expansion, the Pittsburgh Penguins have played home games in downtown Pittsburgh since their inception—first at the Civic Arena, and since 2010 at PPG Paints Arena. The Penguins won back-to-back Stanley Cup championships in 1991 and 1992. The franchise recorded their third Stanley Cup in 2009. The teams included players Mark Recchi, Kevin Stevens, Jaromír Jágr, and Mario Lemieux. Lemieux holds multiple franchise records and was elected to the Hockey Hall of Fame in 1997. He suffered from multiple injuries, including Hodgkin's lymphoma, throughout his career. In 1999, Lemieux purchased the Penguins and saved the franchise from bankruptcy. He returned to play one year later as the first player/owner of the modern era. The Penguins, led by top point scorers Evgeni Malkin and Sidney Crosby, returned to the Stanley Cup Final in 2008 and won the franchise's third Cup in 2009. The franchise recorded their fourth and fifth Stanley Cups consecutively in 2016 and 2017.

=== Football ===
On November 12, 1892, Pudge Heffelfinger was paid $500 to participate in an American football game for the Allegheny Athletic Association. With this transaction, Heffelfinger became the first person to be paid to play football. The first professional football game was held at Recreation Park in Pittsburgh. Heffelfinger scored the game's only points as the Allegheny Athletic Association defeated the Pittsburgh Athletic Club, 4–0. The early professional football era was also represented in Pittsburgh, by top athletic association teams in the Western Pennsylvania Professional Football Circuit. The Duquesne Country and Athletic Club, was the top pro team in the state in 1898 and 1899. The first ever pro football all-star game was played at Exposition Park between the Duquesne Country and Athletic Club and a collection of players from several teams in the area on December 3, 1898. Duquesne won the game 16–0. Later the Homestead Library & Athletic Club, fielded the top pro team in the state in 1900 and 1901. In 1902 the top players in the area, mainly from the Duquesne Country and Athletic Club line-up, formed the Pittsburgh Stars of the first National Football League. The Stars were suspected of being financed by Barney Dreyfuss and William Chase Temple, the owners of baseball's Pittsburgh Pirates. The team featured baseball players in the line-up including Christy Mathewson, a future Hall of Fame pitcher with the New York Giants and Fred Crolius, and outfielder with Pirates. The team won the league's only championship in 1902.

In 1933, as the oldest of nine children Art Rooney, who had been raised on the North Side of Pittsburgh, founded the Pittsburgh Steelers. Originally nicknamed the Pirates, the team later changed their name to the Steelers, to represent the city's heritage of producing steel. The Steelers' first season with a winning record came in 1942. However, they lost their first playoff game in 1947. In 1969, the Steelers hired head coach Chuck Noll who strategically drafted players in order to improve the team. Three years later, in the first playoff game at Three Rivers Stadium Pittsburgh's rookie running back Franco Harris returned an errant pass that bounced off an opposing player for a game-winning touchdown in a play that later became labeled the Immaculate Reception. In 1974, the Steelers won their first Super Bowl in franchise history—a feat which they would repeat in 1975, 1978, and 1979 to become the first NFL franchise to win four Super Bowls. In 1992, Noll was succeeded by Bill Cowher, who led the franchise to its fifth Super Bowl victory in 2005. Mike Tomlin succeeded Cower and led the Steelers to an NFL record sixth Super Bowl victory in 2008. As of 2009, the Steelers have 18 members in the Pro Football Hall of Fame. In October 1964, Ernie Stautner, who played on the Steelers from 1950 to 1963, became the only Steelers' player to have his number—70—retired. Charles "Mean Joe" Greene had his number—75—retired in 2014. In 2008, ESPN.com ranked Steelers' fans as the best in the NFL, citing their "unbelievable" sellout streak of 299 consecutive games. Steelers Chairman Dan Rooney, son of founder Art Rooney, became the majority owner of the Steelers in November 2008 along with his son Art II, after they bought all of the shares of two of his four brothers.

Outside of the NFL, the city was represented by the Pittsburgh Americans of the second American Football League in 1936 and 1937. It was also briefly represented by the Pittsburgh Maulers of the United States Football League, in 1984, and the Pittsburgh Gladiators (which later became the Tampa Bay Storm), of the Arena Football League from 1987 until 1990. A second Arena Football League team, the Pittsburgh Power, played in the Consol Energy Center from 2011 until 2014.

In addition, Pittsburgh has also been home to women's full-contact football teams. The Pittsburgh Passion were founded in 2002 as members of the National Women's Football Association, then played in the Independent Women's Football League, and then Women's Football Alliance. The Passion play their home games at West Allegheny High School in nearby Imperial. The team went 12–0 and won a national title in 2007 as members of the NWFA. The Pittsburgh Rebellion were members of the Legends Football League during the 2017 season with home games at the downtown Highmark Stadium.

The "most established area minor-league football team" the Pittsburgh Colts are members of the North American Football League's Regional American Football League.

The United States Football League (2022) announced that the league would be relaunching in April 2022 and that the Pittsburgh Maulers would be returning

=== Soccer ===
Pittsburgh Riverhounds SC are members of the USL Championship (second division) and play at F.N.B. Stadium.

The Riverhounds are one of the oldest professional soccer clubs in the United States operating outside of MLS; the only two older clubs are fellow USL Championship side Charleston Battery and USL League One's Richmond Kickers, both of which were founded in 1993. Like their counterparts, the Steelers, Penguins and Pirates, the Riverhounds are a full-time professional club, and many of their current and former players have represented their countries in international play.

In 2024, the USL W League announced that the Riverhounds' ownership group had established a women's team to begin competing in 2025. Several months later, the club's name, Pittsburgh Riveters SC, and crest were unveiled.

Steel City FC is a pre-professional club that originated as a youth soccer team in the 1980s. In addition to multiple youth teams, the club fields both a men's and women's senior team competing in the USL League Two and USL W League respectively, with the women's team competing in the same division as the aforementioned Pittsburgh Riveters SC.

Historic teams such as the suburban Harmarville Hurricanes won the U.S. Open Cup, U.S. Soccer's national championship, with Harmarville winning in 1952 and 1956 and reaching the final in 1953. Pittsburgh area teams Gallatin and Morgan Strasser also won the Open Cup in its earlier years, but since the end of the 1950s, only the Riverhounds have advanced as far as the quarterfinals, which they achieved in 2001 and 2023. The amateur club Pittsburgh Beadling has contested for regional and national titles for over 100 years, winning the National Amateur Cup in 1954, though Beadling now operates primarily as a youth club.

Aldo Donelli, better known as a Duquesne University Football player and coach played soccer with a number of clubs in the 1920s and 1930s and was a member of the United States men's national soccer team during the 1934 FIFA World Cup. He is a member of the National Soccer Hall of Fame. In a 4–2 qualifying victory over Mexico in Rome, Italy on May 24, he tallied all four times, becoming the first American to score his first three international goals with the senior team in the same match.

The region's interest in soccer continues as modern stars such as natives Justin Evans, Meghan Klingenberg, Don Malinowski, John Stollmeyer, A. J. Wood and Marvell Wynne II have all achieved international success.

=== Rugby ===
The Pittsburgh Forge Rugby Club are a rugby union team based in South Side Pittsburgh. The club formed in 2018 when the Pittsburgh City RC and the Pittsburgh Highlanders combined to form the Forge. The Pittsburgh Forge currently fields two competitive men's senior sides and one competitive women's side. The men currently participate in the Midwest Competition Region (NCR1) at the Division II and Division III levels, and the women also play in the Midwest Competition Region at the Division II level.

The Pittsburgh Sledgehammers were a rugby league team based in Cheswick, Pennsylvania (outside of Pittsburgh) which was formed in 2010 and played in the AMNRL competition.

The Pittsburgh Harlequins are a rugby union team also based in Cheswick. The Pittsburgh Harlequins Rugby Club was founded in 1973 by a group of University of Pittsburgh law students. The organization has an active roster of 45 players and an alumni roster inclusive of more than 70 seasons of play. The Harlequins Rugby Club is a Division I member of the Mid-Atlantic Rugby Football Union. Over 300 active players wear the Harlequin jerseys every year at the Division 1 men's, Under 19, and Under 14 levels. In 1995, the Founders Field Center for Athletic Leadership was developed to support the Harlequins Men's and Youth programs. The 12-acre Founders Field facility includes lighting, irrigation, a clubhouse, locker rooms, concessions, and parking.

The Pittsburgh Steeltoes, a rugby sevens club with both a men's and women's team, was announced as an expansion team for the Premier Rugby Sevens in 2023. Highmark Stadium hosted the 2023 Eastern Conference Final, marking the first ever professional rugby event held in the city. Three of the Steeltoes' women represented their countries at the 2024 Summer Olympics: Kayla Canett and Sammy Sullivan for the United States and Asia Hogan-Rochester for Canada, winning bronze and silver, respectively.

=== Ultimate ===
The Pittsburgh Thunderbirds are a professional ultimate team that competes in the Ultimate Frisbee Association (formerly known as the American Ultimate Disc League) since 2015. They play their home games at Highmark Stadium.

== Major league professional championships, awards, and events ==
=== Pittsburgh Steelers (NFL) ===
6 Super Bowl titles

- 1974 (IX)
- 1975 (X)
- 1978 (XIII)
- 1979 (XIV)
- 2005 (XL)
- 2008 (XLIII)

=== Pittsburgh Penguins (NHL) ===
5 Stanley Cup titles

- 1991
- 1992
- 2009
- 2016
- 2017

=== Pittsburgh Pirates (MLB) ===
5 World Series titles

- 1909
- 1925
- 1960
- 1971
- 1979

=== Homestead Grays (NNL) ===
3 Negro World Series titles

- 1943
- 1944
- 1948

=== Pittsburgh Pipers (ABA) ===
1 ABA Finals title

- 1968

==== Championship game/series appearances ====
Franchise	Season (Note: Includes conference championships and post-1900 MLB league pennants.)
Pirates	1903
Pirates	1909
Pirates	1925
Pirates	1927
Grays	1942
Grays	1943
Grays	1944
Grays	1945
Grays	1948
Pirates	1960
Pipers	1967–68
Pirates	1971
Steelers	1974
Steelers	1975
Steelers	1978
Pirates	1979
Steelers	1979
Penguins	1990–91
Penguins	1991–92
Steelers	1995
Steelers	2005
Penguins	2007–08
Steelers	2008
Penguins	2008–09
Steelers	2010
Penguins	2015–16
Penguins	2016–17

=== Awards ===
==== MVPs ====
The following Pittsburgh players won the regular season most valuable player award of the NFL (AP), MLB, or NHL. Note that MLB confers an MVP award to one player in the American League and one player in the National League.

- Paul Waner, NL, 1927
- Bill Dudley, NFL, 1946
- Dick Groat, NL, 1960
- Roberto Clemente, NL, 1966
- Dave Parker, NL, 1978
- Terry Bradshaw, NFL, 1978
- Willie Stargell, NL, 1979
- Mario Lemieux, NHL, 1987–88, 1992–93, 1995–96
- Barry Bonds, NL, 1990, 1992
- Jaromír Jágr, NHL, 1998–99
- Sidney Crosby, NHL, 2006–07, 2013–14
- Evgeni Malkin, NHL, 2011–12
- Andrew McCutchen, NL, 2013

==== Other awards ====
Player	League	Award	Year
Vern Law	NL	Cy Young Award	1960
Joe Greene	NFL	Defensive Rookie of the Year	1969
Roberto Clemente	NL	World Series MVP	1971
Joe Greene	NFL	Defensive Player of the Year	1972
Franco Harris	NFL	Offensive Player of the Year	1972
Joe Greene	NFL	Defensive Player of the Year	1974
Jack Lambert	NFL	Defensive Rookie of the Year	1974
Franco Harris	NFL	Super Bowl MVP	1974
Mel Blount	NFL	Defensive Player of the Year	1975
Lynn Swann	NFL	Super Bowl MVP	1975
Jack Lambert	NFL	Defensive Player of the Year	1976
Terry Bradshaw	NFL	Super Bowl MVP	1978
Willie Stargell	NL	World Series MVP	1979
Terry Bradshaw	NFL	Super Bowl MVP	1979
Randy Carlyle	NHL	James Norris Memorial Trophy	1980–81
Louis Lipps	NFL	Offensive Rookie of the Year	1984
Mario Lemieux	NHL	Calder Memorial Trophy	1984–85
Mario Lemieux	NHL	Art Ross Trophy	1987–88
Mario Lemieux	NHL	Art Ross Trophy	1988–89
Doug Drabek	NL	Cy Young Award	1990
Jim Leyland	NL	Manager of the Year	1990
Mario Lemieux	NHL	Conn Smythe Trophy	1990–91
Mario Lemieux	NHL	Art Ross Trophy	1991–92
Mario Lemieux	NHL	Conn Smythe Trophy	1991–92
Jim Leyland	NL	Manager of the Year	1992
Mario Lemieux	NHL	Art Ross Trophy	1992–93
Rod Woodson	NFL	Defensive Player of the Year	1993
Jaromír Jágr	NHL	Art Ross Trophy	1994–95
Ron Francis	NHL	Frank J. Selke Trophy	1994–95
Mario Lemieux	NHL	Art Ross Trophy	1995–96
Mario Lemieux	NHL	Art Ross Trophy	1996–97
Jaromír Jágr	NHL	Art Ross Trophy	1997–98
Jaromír Jágr	NHL	Art Ross Trophy	1998–99
Jaromír Jágr	NHL	Art Ross Trophy	1999–2000
Jaromír Jágr	NHL	Art Ross Trophy	2000–01
Kendrell Bell	NFL	Defensive Rookie of the Year	2001
Jason Bay	NL	Rookie of the Year	2004
Ben Roethlisberger	NHL	Offensive Rookie of the Year	2004
Hines Ward	NFL	Super Bowl MVP	2005
Sidney Crosby	NHL	Art Ross Trophy	2006–07
Evgeni Malkin	NHL	Calder Memorial Trophy	2006–07
James Harrison	NFL	Defensive Player of the Year	2008
Santonio Holmes	NFL	Super Bowl MVP	2008
Evgeni Malkin	NHL	Art Ross Trophy	2008–09
Evgeni Malkin	NHL	Conn Smythe Trophy	2008–09
Sidney Crosby	NHL	Maurice "Rocket" Richard Trophy	2009–10
Troy Polamalu	NFL	Defensive Player of the Year	2010
Dan Bylsma	NHL	Jack Adams Trophy	2010–11
Evgeni Malkin	NHL	Art Ross Trophy	2011–12
Ray Shero	NHL	General Manager of the Year	2012–13
Clint Hurdle	NL	Manager of the Year	2013
Sidney Crosby	NHL	Art Ross Trophy	2013–14
Sidney Crosby	NHL	Conn Smythe Trophy	2015–16
Jim Rutherford	NHL	General Manager of the Year	2015–16
Sidney Crosby	NHL	Conn Smythe Trophy	2016–17
T. J. Watt	NFL	Defensive Player of the Year	2021
Paul Skenes	NL	Rookie of the Year	2024
Paul Skenes	NL	Cy Young Award	2025

=== Major sports events held in Pittsburgh ===
Pittsburgh has hosted the following All-Star games and drafts:

- 1944 MLB All-Star Game
- 1948 NFL draft
- 1959 MLB All-Star Game
- 1974 MLB All-Star Game
- 1990 NHL All-Star Game
- 1994 MLB All-Star Game
- 1997 NHL draft
- 2006 MLB All-Star Game
- 2012 NHL draft
- 2026 NFL draft

== Other professional championships and awards ==
=== Pittsburgh Passion (WFA) ===
1 NWFA title, 2 IWFL titles

- 2007
- 2014
- 2015

=== Steel City Yellow Jackets (ABA) ===
1 ABA title

- 2021-22

=== Pittsburgh Riverhounds SC (USLC) ===
1 USL Championship title

- 2025

=== Pittsburgh Hornets (AHL) ===
3 Calder Cup titles

- 1951-52
- 1954-55
- 1966-67

=== Pittsburgh Triangles (WTT) ===
1 WTT title

- 1975

==== Championship game/series appearances ====
Franchise	Season
Hornets	1939-40
Hornets	1946-47
Hornets	1950-51
Hornets	1951-52
Hornets	1952-53
Hornets	1954-55
Hornets	1966-67
Pipers	1967-68
Triangles	1975
Gladiators	1987
Gladiators	1989
Passion	2007
Passion	2014
Passion	2015
Yellow Jackets	2021-22
Maulers	2023
Steeltoes	2023
Riverhounds	2025
Passion	2026

=== Awards ===
==== MVPs ====
The following Pittsburgh players won the regular season most valuable player award of the American Basketball Association, Major Indoor Soccer League, Arena Football League, Women's Football Alliance or USL Championship). Note that WFA confers an MVP award to one player in the American Conference and one player in the National Conference.

- Connie Hawkins, ABA MVP, 1967–68
- Stanisław Terlecki, MISL MVP, 1981–82
- Russell Hairston, AFL MVP, 1987
- José Angulo, USL Pro MVP, 2013
- Albert Dikwa, USL Championship MVP, 2023
- Marcelina Chavez, WFA National Conference MVP, 2024

==== Other awards ====
Player	Team	League	Award	Year
Baz Bastien	Hornets	AHL	Harry "Hap" Holmes Memorial Award	1947–48
Sid Smith	Hornets	AHL	Carl Liscombe Trophy	1948–49
Baz Bastien	Hornets	AHL	Harry "Hap" Holmes Memorial Award	1948–49
Gilles Mayer	Hornets	AHL	Harry "Hap" Holmes Memorial Award	1950–51
Gilles Mayer	Hornets	AHL	Harry "Hap" Holmes Memorial Award	1952–53
Gilles Mayer	Hornets	AHL	Harry "Hap" Holmes Memorial Award	1953–54
Gilles Mayer	Hornets	AHL	Harry "Hap" Holmes Memorial Award	1954–55
Gilles Mayer	Hornets	AHL	Harry "Hap" Holmes Memorial Award	1955–56
Roger Crozier	Hornets	AHL	Dudley "Red" Garrett Memorial Award	1963–64
Roger Crozier	Hornets	AHL	Happy "Hap" Holmes Memorial Award	1963–64
Bob McCord	Hornets	AHL	Eddie Shore Award	1966–67
Vince Cazzetta	Pipers	ABA	ABA Coach of the Year Award	1967–68
Connie Hawkins	Pipers	ABA	ABA Playoffs MVP	1967–68
Len Bilous	Spirit	MISL	Coach of the Year	1979–80
Kevin Maher	Spirit	MISL	Rookie of the Year	1983–84
Thomas Monroe	Gladiators	AFL	AFL Ironman of the Year Award	1990
Joe Greenspan	Riverhounds	USLC	Defender of the Year	2019
Danny Vitiello	Riverhounds	USLC	Golden Glove	2020
Kenny Holmes	Yellow Jackets	ABA	ABA Playoffs MVP	2022
Ben Pinkelman	Steeltoes	PR7s	Men's Comeback Player of the Year	2023
Albert Dikwa	Riverhounds	USLC	Golden Boot	2023
Arturo Ordoñez	Riverhounds	USLC	Defender of the Year	2023
Bob Lilley	Riverhounds	USLC	Coach of the Year	2023
Teresa Conn	Passion	WFA	Coach of the Year	2024
Eric Dick	Riverhounds	USLC	Golden Glove	2024
Eric Dick	Riverhounds	USLC	Goalkeeper of the Year	2024
Jana Meister	Passion	WFA	National Conference Offensive Player of the Year	2025
Danasha Harris	Passion	WFA	National Conference Defensive Player of the Year	2025
Eric Dick	Riverhounds	USLC	USL Championship Final MVP	2025
Ellisyn Knapo	Passion	WFA	National Conference Offensive Player of the Year	2026
Lisa Horton	Passion	WFA	National Conference Coach of the Year	2026

== Individual sports and recreation ==
=== Golf ===
Golf has deep roots in the area, with the region boasting the oldest course in continuous use in the nation, dating from 1887: Foxburg Country Club. The suburban Oakmont Country Club has hosted the U.S. Open championships more than any other course in the nation (9) along with two U.S. Women's Open championships, three PGA Championships, and eight U.S. Amateurs.

Such golf legends as Arnold Palmer, Jim Furyk and Rocco Mediate learned the game and began their careers on Pittsburgh area courses. Suburban courses such as Laurel Valley Golf Club and the Pittsburgh Field Club have hosted PGA Championships (1937, 1965), the Ryder Cup (1975), LPGA Championships (1957–1958), Senior Players Championships (2012–2013) and the Senior PGA Championship (2005).

Local courses have sponsored annual major tournaments for 39 years:

- Pennsylvania Open 1920–1940 (even years)
- Dapper Dan Open 1939–1949
- Pittsburgh Open 1956
- Pittsburgh Senior Classic 1993–1998
- 84 Lumber Classic 2001–2006
- Mylan Classic 2010–2013

The suburban Oakmont Country Club has hosted the U.S. Open Championships more than any other course at nine, and thus the Pittsburgh metro area more than any other metro. Oakmont has also hosted two U.S. Women's Open championships, three PGA Championships, and eight U.S. Amateurs. Other area courses such as Laurel Valley Golf Club and the Pittsburgh Field Club have hosted PGA Championships, the Ryder Cup, LPGA Championships and Senior PGA Championships.

The region has hosted annual PGA Tour events such as the 84 Lumber Classic (2001–2006) at Mystic Rock, the Dapper Dan Open 1939–49, the Pittsburgh Open (1950s), the Tri State Open (1980s), the Pittsburgh Senior Classic (1993–1998) and since 2010 the annual Mylan Classic.

Golf greats such as Arnold Palmer, Jim Furyk, Rocco Mediate and others hail from the region.

=== Fishing ===
Since the 1960s the city has focused on revitalizing its rivers, hosting the Bassmaster Classic and the Forrest Wood Cup in the 2000s and seeing a boom in local fishing participation. The city's rivers contain catfish and trout, among other species.

=== Rowing, rafting, and kayaking ===
Pittsburgh is the host city for both the annual Three Rivers Regatta (since 1977) and the annual Head of the Ohio (since 1987) races and events. The University of Pittsburgh, Carnegie Mellon University and Duquesne University as well as several area high schools have long standing rowing teams.

In 2010 National Geographic named the city to its list of the "Six Best Cities for Kayaking". Suburban Ohiopyle State Park offers some of the best white-water rafting in the country.

=== Trails, camping, biking ===
Pittsburgh has multiple mountain biking areas close to the city in area parks and in the surrounding suburbs. Frick Park has biking trails and Hartwood Acres Park has many miles of single track trails. A recent project, "Rails to Trails", has converted miles of former railroads to recreational trails, including a Pittsburgh-Washington, D.C. bike/walking trail. Kayaking is popular on the city's three rivers.

Pittsburgh and its surroundings are internationally known for their extensive and varied trail system. Such assets as the Three Rivers, Ohio River, Youghiogheny River, Beaver River, Indian Creek, Panhandle, Laurel Highlands, Rachel Carson, Five Star and Montour offer natural, suburban and urban views of the metropolitan area. The Great Allegheny Passage provides an all natural-trail (non motorized) link to Washington, D.C., while the North Country Trail passes through the northern suburbs of the city and connects Bismarck, North Dakota to the Plattsburgh, New York area, with cities like Duluth, Minnesota and Buffalo, New York in its path.

Within the urban core of the city and its immediate surroundings the public stairways in Pittsburgh offer an urban hiking experience. "Urban oasis" parks that bring the wilds of nature into the middle of the urban core and feature over a mile of trails within their individual boundaries include: Point State, Frick, Highland, Schenley, Riverview, Grandview, South Side, Riverfront, Three Rivers, Point of View, and Roberto Clemente.

There are many laarge 500–2,000 acre suburban parks featuring several miles of diverse trails each.

- Northern suburbs: North, Hartwood Acres, Harrison Hills, Deer Lakes, Moraine, McConnells Mill
- Southern suburbs: South, Round Hill, Ohiopyle
- Western suburbs: Settler's Cabin, Hillman, Raccoon Creek
- Eastern suburbs: Boyce, White Oak, Renziehausen, Keystone, Laurel Mountain, Laurel Ridge, Laurel Summit, Linn Run, Forbes

For hikers/trailblazers that desire a historical or cultural element to nature the metropolitan area offers the Fort Necessity National Battlefield, Bushy Run Battlefield, the Bear Run conservancy containing both Fallingwater and Kentuck Knob, the smaller yet hikable Meadowcroft Rock Shelter features pre-Columbian archeology. The large urban parks described earlier such as Schenley Park includes several historical/cultural sites including Phipps Conservatory and proximity to Schenley Plaza, the Cathedral of Learning, Hillman Library and the Frick Gallery. Riverview includes the Allegheny Observatory and Point includes the Fort Pitt Museum and the remains of Fort Duquesne.

For true environmentalists and wildlife fans the metro area includes the Jennings Environmental Education Center, as well the Allegheny Islands State Park, Ohio River Islands National Wildlife Refuge and Ohiopyle for hiking and water sports.

=== Tennis ===
Such teams as the Pittsburgh Triangles have built a fan base for tennis in the region, being a perennial championship contender in the 1970s and winning a world title in 1975.

From 1979 to 1984 the city also hosted a yearly international tournament, the Pittsburgh Open.

=== Skiing/skating ===
Seven Springs Mountain Resort, Hidden Valley, Pennsylvania, Wisp Ski Resort and Boyce Park offer skiing with both PPG Place and North Park offering ice skating. In 2011, the Pittsburgh Penguins created a new public rink in the South Side neighborhood's Southside Works called "Penguin Pond".

Year round ice skating and skating events can be enjoyed at indoor area rinks including the Rostraver Ice Garden, Island Sports Center, IceoPlex at Southpointe and Bladerunners Ice Complex.

Such notable Olympians as natives Kristi Leskinen, Kylie Gleason, Suna Murray, Ron Robertson, Mike Seibert, Suzanne Semanick, Jamie Silverstein and Taylor Toth have trained and begun their careers at area facilities.

Youth sports Youth football Suburban league, Big East youth football league Penn Trafford, Woodland Hills, Greater Latrobe, Jeannette, PHMFA, Arken, Franklin Regional, Plum, Mckeesport, Gateway

== College sports ==
There are several universities within the city that field athletic teams in NCAA Division I including the University of Pittsburgh (often referred to as "Pitt"), Duquesne University and Robert Morris University. Of these, Pitt is the only school that is a member of the so-called "Power Five" conferences that are primary partners in the College Football Playoff structure (the Atlantic Coast Conference). Other universities in Pittsburgh that field athletic teams include Carnegie Mellon University (Division III), Chatham University (Division III), Point Park University (NAIA), and Carlow University (NAIA).

=== Football ===
College football in Pittsburgh dates back to the University of Pittsburgh which first organized a football team in 1889 and played its first sanctioned game in 1890. In the first half of the 20th century, Pitt, Duquesne, and Carnegie Tech (now called Carnegie Mellon) all fielded football squads that made "major" bowl game appearances from the 1920s through the 1930s. These appearances included Duquesne in the 1933 and 1936 Orange Bowl, Carnegie Tech in the 1938 Sugar Bowl, and the University of Pittsburgh appearing in four Rose Bowls (1927, 1929, 1932, 1936) as well as nearby Washington and Jefferson College in the 1922 Rose Bowl. In particular, Pitt was a national power during this era, claiming 8 national championships under the guidance of coaching legends such as Pop Warner and Jock Sutherland. More recently, the Panthers won another National Championship in 1976 and competed for several more through the 1980s. Multiple inductees into the College Football Hall of Fame played at Pitt, including Dan Marino, Tony Dorsett, Mike Ditka, and Larry Fitzgerald. Pitt is the only university in Western Pennsylvania to still play college football at the highest level, the Football Bowl Subdivision, while Duquesne and Robert Morris have football teams that compete in the Football Championship Subdivision, and Carnegie Mellon fields a Division III football team.

=== Basketball ===
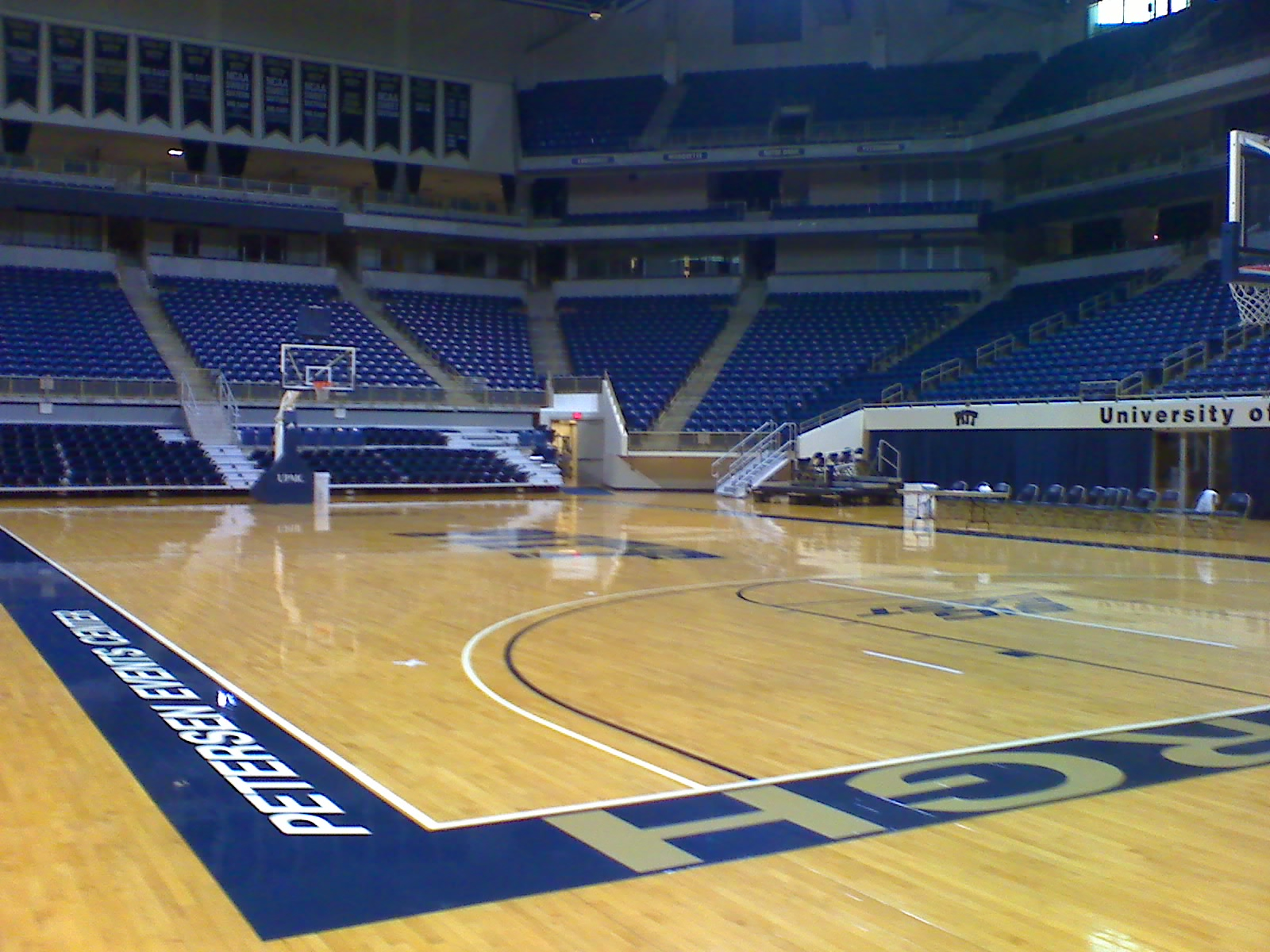
The Petersen Events Center, basketball home of the Pittsburgh Panthers

The Duquesne University Dukes and the University of Pittsburgh Panthers have played college basketball in the city since 1914 and 1905 respectively. Pitt and Duquesne have played the annual City Game since 1932. Duquesne was the city's first team to appear in a Final Four (1940), obtain a number one AP Poll ranking (1954), and to win a post-season national title, the 1955 National Invitation Tournament on its second straight trip to the NIT title game. Duquesne is the only college program to produce back-to-back NBA No. 1 overall draft picks with 1955's Dick Ricketts and 1956's Sihugo Green. Duquesne's Chuck Cooper was the first African American drafted by an NBA team.

The Panthers won two pre-tournament era Helms Athletic Foundation National Championships in 1928 and 1930, competed in a "national title game" against LSU in 1935, and made a Final Four appearance in 1941. Pitt has won 13 conference titles, qualified for the NCAA tournament 26 times including a post season tournament every season between 1999-2000 and 2015-2016 during which time it regularly sold out the Petersen Events Center. The program has produced 27 NBA draft picks and 15 All Americans while ranking No. 1 in the nation as recently as 2009. The Petersen Events Center is home to the "Oakland Zoo", a student section which is nationally recognized for its passionate members and perseverance through consecutive unsuccessful seasons from 2016 to 2022.

The suburban Robert Morris University's Colonials have competed in NCAA Division I basketball since the 1970s, qualifying for the NCAA tournament in each of the last four decades (8). In the 2013 National Invitation Tournament the Colonials notched an upset win over the defending national champions Kentucky Wildcats.

Pitt women's basketball has also made appearances in the NCAA tournament, last appearing in 2015. A rivalry game between Pitt and Duquesne, termed the City Game, is played annually between the two schools' men's and women's basketball teams, as well as their baseball teams.

=== Other collegiate sports ===
Along with college football and men's and women's basketball, area universities compete in many additional sports. The University of Pittsburgh also fields NCAA Division I teams in baseball (its oldest sport. first played in 1869), cross country, gymnastics, track and field, soccer, softball, swimming and diving, tennis, volleyball, and wrestling. The Duquesne Dukes, in addition to many of the sports above, also participates in Division I lacrosse, golf, and rowing. Robert Morris University fields Division I teams in men's and women's hockey, among other sports.

== Major events ==
Event	Number	Venue	Years
PGA Championship	5	Oakmont Country Club; Pittsburgh Field Club; Laurel Valley Golf Club	1922, 1951, 1978; 1937; 1965
Senior PGA Championship	1	Laurel Valley Golf Club	2005
PGA Tour Champions	5	Laurel Valley Golf Club; Fox Chapel Golf Club	1989; 2012, 2013, 2014
US Open	9	Oakmont Country Club	1927, 1935, 1953, 1962, 1973, 1983, 1994, 2007, 2016
Ryder Cup	1	Laurel Valley Golf Club	1975
MLB All Star Game	5	Forbes Field; Three Rivers Stadium; PNC Park	1944, 1959; 1974, 1994; 2006
NHL All Star Game	1	Pittsburgh Civic Arena	1990
NHL entry draft	2	Pittsburgh Civic Arena; PPG Paints Arena	1997; 2012
NHL Stadium Series	1	Acrisure Stadium	2017
NHL Winter Classic	1	Acrisure Stadium	2011
AHL All-Star Game	1	Duquesne Gardens	1956
NCAA Men's Final Four Tournament	3	Pittsburgh Civic Arena; PPG Paints Arena	1997, 2002; 2012
NCAA Men's Frozen Four Tournament	1	PPG Paints Arena	2013
NCAA Women's Final Four Tournament	3	Pittsburgh Civic Arena; Petersen Events Center	2001; 2007, 2010

== Annual events ==
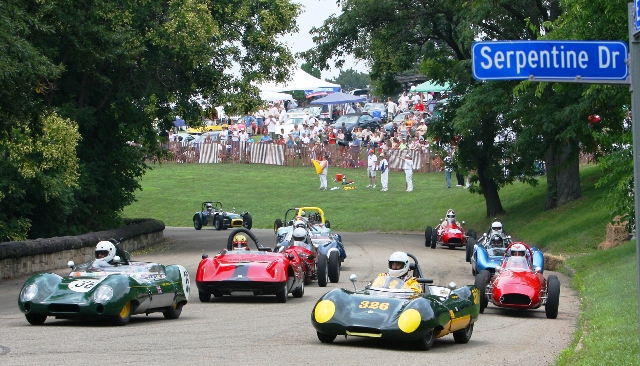
Pittsburgh Vintage Grand Prix

Pittsburgh also hosts several annual major sporting events, including the:

- Three Rivers Regatta (since 1977)
- Pittsburgh Vintage Grand Prix (since 1983)
- Dirty Dozen Cycle Race (since 1983)
- Pittsburgh Marathon (since 1985)
- Great Race 10K (since 1985)
- Head of the Ohio Regatta (since 1987)
- Three Rivers Classic (since 2012)
- Great Pittsburgh Soap Box Derby

The city's rivers have attracted annual world title competitions of the Forrest Wood Cup in 2009 and the Bassmaster Classic in 2005.

Annual events continue during the winter months at area ski resorts such as Boyce Park, Seven Springs, Hidden Valley and Wisp as well as ice skating at PPG Place and North Park.

=== Rivers ===
A Formula 1 ChampBoat Series race, the Pittsburgh Three Rivers Regatta, is the largest inland regatta in the country during July at Point State Park. There is also an annual large rowing regatta, the Head of the Ohio, which was founded in 1987 and is one of the largest inland regattas in the United States.

=== Motorsports ===
The Pittsburgh Vintage Grand Prix, the last remaining vintage automobile race run on city streets in the United States, is held annually at Schenley Park.

=== Running ===
For 30 years Pittsburgh has also hosted a large 10K and 5K road race, the Richard S. Caliguiri City of Pittsburgh Great Race, which attracts nearly 10,000 athletes and has been ranked as a Top 20 Multi-Race Events by USA Track & Field's publication On The Roads. In addition, the 28th Pittsburgh Marathon will be hosted in the city in May 2018.

=== Basketball ===
Pittsburgh was previously home to the first national high school all-star basketball game, The Dapper Dan Roundball Classic, from 1965 to 1992, prior to its move to Detroit and later Chicago. The Roundball Classic annually featured future NBA hall of famers at the Civic Arena with ESPN televising. Pittsburgh has long been home to the City Game between Pitt and Duquesne.

=== Cycling ===
Since 1983 the Dirty Dozen Cycle Race has been held in the city.

=== Awards banquet ===
Since 1936 the Dapper Dan Charities, a civic sports organization founded in part by a former editor of the Pittsburgh Post-Gazette, has hosted an annual local and national celebrity and sport star dinner first at the William Penn Hotel then at the Hilton ballrooms and more recently at the David L. Lawrence Convention Center.

== Other events ==
Pittsburgh has its own cricket league conducted by the Pittsburgh Cricket Association (PCA). The PCA, revived in 2004 from the long dormant 1882 Pittsburgh Cricket Club charter, comprises 16 active teams and more than 250 members. It is a non-profit corporation organized for charitable purposes to further the sport of cricket in Pittsburgh and surrounding areas. The specific purposes for which this corporation is organized are: to promote, encourage, foster and cultivate interest in the sport of cricket; to initiate, sponsor, promote and carry out plans, policies and activities that would further the development and advancement of cricket in Pittsburgh and Northeastern PA; to develop, foster and train amateur athletes for representation in state, national and international cricket competitions; and to promote the building of facilities for other non-traditional sports like badminton, table tennis and rugby. The league features about 16 teams and the games are held at Linbrook Park and Edgebrook Field.

- Tennis: Historically the Pittsburgh Triangles of the 1970s played tennis at the Civic Arena, winning the WTT championship in 1975. The arena also hosted the Pittsburgh Open tennis tournament from 1979 until 1984. The year-round facilities at Mellon Park Tennis Center currently serve the city.
- Gaelic football: Teams such as the Celtics (men's) and Banshees (women's), founded in 1976 and 2002, respectively. The Celtics won the Midwest title in 2002, 2006, and won both the midwest and National titles in 2011. The Banshees won the Midwest title in 2004, 2005, and both the midwest and Junior B shield national title in 2011.
- Roller derby: The Steel City Derby Demons of the WFTDA.
- Dodgeball: NDL's Pittsburgh Punishers.

== People ==
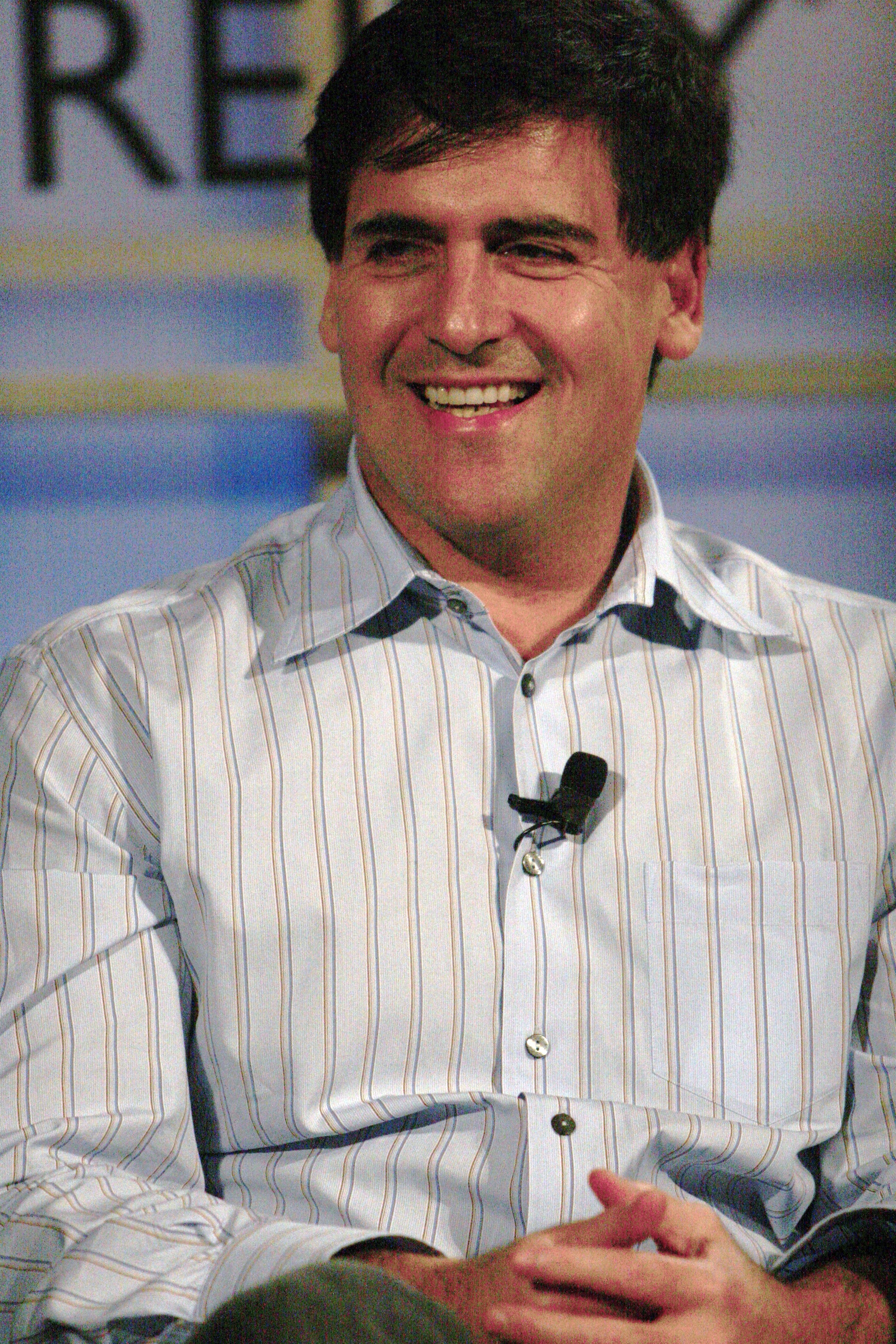
Pittsburgh native Mark Cuban, owner of the Dallas Mavericks

Multiple professional athletes were born or raised in the Pittsburgh area. Major League Baseball players Ken Griffey Sr., his Hall of Fame son Ken Griffey Jr., and Hall of Famer Stan Musial were born in Donora, Pennsylvania. The Hall of Fame inductee, player, and manager of the Pittsburgh Pirates, Honus Wagner was born and raised in Chartiers. Major League outfielder Tito Francona and pitcher Doc Medich were born in Aliquippa. Super Bowl winning coaches Bill Cowher and Mike Ditka were born in Pittsburgh and Carnegie respectively. Super Bowl winning quarterback Joe Namath and Heisman Trophy winner Tony Dorsett were born in Beaver Falls and Rochester respectively. 3 Time Super Bowl MVP Joe Montana is from New Eagle. Jim Kelly from East Brady was the leading QB of the Buffalo Bills to 4 straight Super Bowl appearances. Johnny Unitas, National Football League's most valuable player in 1959, 1964 and 1967 is from Pittsburgh as well. Owner of the Dallas Mavericks, Mark Cuban and Basketball Hall of Fame member Jack Twyman were born in Pittsburgh. Olympic gold medalists Swin Cash and Kurt Angle, the latter of whom went on to become a major star in professional wrestling, were born in McKeesport and Pittsburgh respectively. Professional golfers Rocco Mediate and Arnold Palmer were born in Greensburg and Latrobe respectively. Author Jim O'Brien, who was born in Pittsburgh, has authored 20 books about Pittsburgh sports.

=== Cradle of quarterbacks ===
The Pittsburgh region also has developed many notable athletes that have gone on to outstanding careers in professional sports. The region has produced a multitude of NFL quarterbacks, giving Western Pennsylvania the nickname "Cradle of Quarterbacks". Dan Marino, Joe Montana, Joe Namath, Jim Kelly, Johnny Unitas, Bruce Gradkowski, Marc Bulger, George Blanda, Johnny Lujack, Jeff Hostetler, Gus Frerotte, Willie Thrower, Warren Heller, Johnny Gildea, Tyler Palko, Alex Van Pelt, Sandy Stephens, Terry Hanratty, Mike McMahon, Major Harris, Matt Cavanaugh, Chuck Fusina, Rod Rutherford, Ted Marchibroda, Babe Parilli, John Hufnagel, Tom Sherman, Richie Lucas, Boyd Brumbaugh, Scott Zolak, Ed Matesic, Tom Clements, Coley McDonough, Charley Seabright and former Pittsburgh Steelers quarterback Charlie Batch all hail from within a 50-mile radius of the city.

== Former professional franchises ==
Club	Sport	League	Venue	First season (in Pittsburgh)	Last season (in Pittsburgh)	Championships (in Pittsburgh)	Fate of team
Allegheny Athletic Association	American football	Western Pennsylvania Professional Football Circuit	Recreation Park	1890	1896	1890, 1892, 1894, 1896	Club folded team
Duquesne Athletic Club	ice hockey	Western Pennsylvania Hockey League	Duquesne Garden	1908–09	1908–09	1909	Folded
Duquesne Country and Athletic Club	American football	Western Pennsylvania Professional Football Circuit	Exposition Park III	1895	1900	1895, 1898, 1899	Club folded team
Duquesne Country and Athletic Club	ice hockey	Western Pennsylvania Hockey League	Duquesne Garden	1895–96	1900–01		Club folded team
Fort Pitt Hornets	ice hockey	United States Amateur Hockey Association	Duquesne Garden	1924–25	1924–25		Team partially merged into the Pittsburgh Pirates
Glassport Odds	American football	Western Pennsylvania Professional Football Circuit	??	1913	1950		Folded
Harmarville Hurricanes	soccer	U.S. Open Cup, National Amateur Cup	??	1947	1967	1952, 1956	Folded
Homestead Grays	baseball	Negro leagues	Forbes Field	1912	1950	1937, 1938, 1939, 1940, 1941, 1943, 1944, 1948	Folded
Homestead Library & Athletic Club	American football	Western Pennsylvania Professional Football Circuit	Carnegie Library of Homestead	1900	1901	1900, 1901	Club folded team
Hope-Harvey/Majestic Radios/J.P. Rooneys	American football	Independent	Exposition Park III	1921	1932	1930, 1931	Team morphed into the Pittsburgh Pirates/Steelers
McKeesport Olympics	American football	Western Pennsylvania Professional Football Circuit, Independent	??	1896	c. 1940		Folded
Pennsylvania Enforcers/Pittsburgh Cougars	ice hockey	America East Hockey League	IceoPlex at Southpointe	2007	2009		Folded
Pennsylvania Pit Bulls/Pittsburgh Hard Hats/Pittsburgh Xplosion	basketball	American Basketball Association, Continental Basketball Association	Pittsburgh Civic Arena / Peterson Events Center	2004	2008		Folded
Pittsburgh	baseball	Ohio–Pennsylvania League	??	1912	1912		Relocated to New Martinsville after just 4 days
Pitcairn Quakers	American football	Western Pennsylvania Professional Football Circuit	Broadway Stadium	1904	1920		Folded
Pittsburgh Allegheny	baseball	International Association for Professional Base Ball Players	Union Park	1876	1878		Folded
Pittsburgh Americans	American football	American Football League II	Forbes Field	1936	1937		Folded
Pittsburgh Athletic Club	American football	Western Pennsylvania Professional Football Circuit	P.A.C. Park	1890	1898	1891	Folded team
Pittsburgh Athletic Club	ice hockey	Western Pennsylvania Hockey League	Duquesne Garden	1895–96	1908–09	1899, 1900, 1901	Folded team
Pittsburgh Bankers	ice hockey	Western Pennsylvania Hockey League	Duquesne Garden	1899–1900	1908–09	1903, 1908	Club folded team
Pittsburgh Bulls	indoor lacrosse	Major Indoor Lacrosse League	Pittsburgh Civic Arena	1990	1993		Folded
Pittsburgh Burghers	baseball	Players' League	Exposition Park III	1890	1890		Folded with the League
Pittsburgh Cannons	soccer	American Soccer League	??	1972	1972		Folded
Pittsburgh Hardhats	softball	APSPL, UPSL	Morrell Field, LaRussa Field	1977	1982		Folded
Pittsburgh Champions	softball	NASL	LaRussa Field	1980	1980		Folded with the league
Pittsburgh Crawfords	baseball	Independent, Negro National League (II), Negro American League	Greenlee Field	1931	1938	1932*, 1933*, 1934, 1935, 1936	Relocated to Toledo
Pittsburgh CrosseFire	indoor lacrosse	National Lacrosse League	Mellon Arena	2000	2000		Relocated to Washington D.C.
Pittsburgh Filipinos	baseball	United States Baseball League, Federal League	Exposition Park III	1912	1913	1912	Became the Pittsburgh Stogies/Rebels
Pittsburgh Force	women's American football	Women's Football Alliance	Campbell Field Munhall, Pennsylvania	2009	2014		Inactive
Pittsburgh Forge	ice hockey	Island Sports Center	North American Hockey League	2001	2004	2003	Relocated to Toledo
Pittsburgh Gladiators	arena football	Pittsburgh Civic Arena	Arena Football League	1987	1990		Relocated to Tampa
Pittsburgh Hornets	ice hockey	American Hockey League	Duquesne Gardens, Pittsburgh Civic Arena	1936-37	1966-67	1951–52, 1954–55, 1966–67	Folded
Pittsburgh Ironmen	basketball	Basketball Association of America	Duquesne Gardens	1946–47	1946-47		Folded
Pittsburgh Keystones	baseball	Negro National League	Ammon Field	1887 1921	1887, 1922		Folded
Pittsburgh Keystones	ice hockey	Western Pennsylvania Hockey League	Schenley Park Casino, Duquesne Garden	1900–01	1903–04	1902	Club folded team
Pittsburgh Lyceum	American football	Western Pennsylvania Professional Football Circuit	Duquesne University, Recreation Park	1902	192?		Club folded team
Pittsburgh Lyceum	ice hockey	Western Pennsylvania Hockey League	Duquesne Garden	1907–08	1908–09		Club folded team
Pittsburgh Maulers	American football	United States Football League	Three Rivers Stadium	1984	1984		Folded
Pittsburgh Maulers	American football	United States Football League (2022)	Tom Benson Hall of Fame Stadium	2022	2023		Folded
Pittsburgh Monticello/Loendi	basketball	Black Fives League	??	1903	192?	1912, 1920, 1921, 1922, 1923	Folded
Pittsburgh Phantoms	basketball	American Basketball Association	Langley High School, Carnegie Library of Homestead	2009	2010		Folded
Pittsburgh Phantoms	soccer	United Soccer Association	Forbes Field	1967	1967		Folded
Pittsburgh Phantoms	roller hockey	Roller Hockey International	Pittsburgh Civic Arena	1994	1994		Folded
Pittsburgh Pipers/Condors	basketball	American Basketball Association	Pittsburgh Civic Arena	1967–68	1970–72	1967–68	Folded
Pittsburgh Piranhas	basketball	Continental Basketball Association	A.J. Palumbo Center	1994–95	1994–95		Folded
Pittsburgh Pirates	ice hockey	National Hockey League	Duquesne Garden	1925–26	1929–30		Relocated to Philadelphia
Pittsburgh Pirates / Raiders	basketball	National Basketball League	??	1937–39	1945		Folded
Pittsburgh Pirates (WPHL)	ice hockey	Western Pennsylvania Hockey League	Duquesne Garden	1907–08	1907–08		Folded
Pittsburgh Power	arena football	Arena Football League	CONSOL Energy Center	2011	2014		Folded
Pittsburgh Professionals	ice hockey	International Professional Hockey League	Duquesne Garden	1904–05	1906–07		Folded with the League
Pittsburgh Rebellion	women's American football	Legends Football League	Highmark Stadium	2017	2017		Folded
Pittsburgh Rens	basketball	American Basketball League	Pittsburgh Civic Arena	1961	1963		Folded with the League
Pittsburgh Shamrocks	ice hockey	International Hockey League	Duquesne Garden	1935–36	1935–36		Folded
Pittsburgh South Side	basketball	Western Pennsylvania Basketball League/ Central Basketball League	??	1903	1915	1904, 1907, 1913	Folded
Pittsburgh Spirit	indoor soccer	Major Soccer League	Pittsburgh Civic Arena	1978	1986		Folded
Pittsburgh Stars	American football	National Football League (1902)	Recreation Park	1902	1902	1902	Folded with the League
Pittsburgh Stingers	indoor soccer	Continental Indoor Soccer League	Pittsburgh Civic Arena	1994	1995		Folded
Pittsburgh Stogies	baseball	Union Association	Exposition Park II	1884	1884		Folded with the League
Pittsburgh Stogies/Rebels	baseball	Federal League	Exposition Park III	1914	1915		Folded with the League
Pittsburgh Triangles	tennis	World TeamTennis	Pittsburgh Civic Arena	1974	1976	1975	Folded
Pittsburgh Victorias	ice hockey	Western Pennsylvania Hockey League	Duquesne Garden	1902–03	1903–04	1904	Club folded team
Pittsburgh Winter Garden	ice hockey	Independent	Winter Garden at Exposition Hall	1915–16	1915–16		Club folded team
Pittsburgh Yellow Jackets	ice hockey	United States Amateur Hockey Association	Duquesne Garden	1915	1925	1924, 1925	Became the Pittsburgh Pirates
Pittsburgh Yellow Jackets	ice hockey	International Hockey League	Duquesne Garden	1930–31	1931–32		Folded
Pittsburgh Yellow Jackets	ice hockey	Eastern Amateur Hockey League	Duquesne Garden	1934–35	1936–37		Folded
Steel City Derby Demons	roller derby	Women's Flat Track Derby Association	Romp'n Roll Roller Skating Rink	2006	2006		Folded

^{*The championships listed for the teams are the highest possible achievement in their respective leagues for each season. For baseball seasons prior to the advent of the World Series in 1903 and the Negro World Series in 1942, National League Championships and Negro National League Championships are listed.}

=== Professional venues ===
Pirates

- Exposition Park I (1882)
- Exposition Park II (1883)
- Recreation Park (1884–1890)
- Exposition Park III (1891–1909)
- Forbes Field (1909–1969)
- Three Rivers Stadium (1970–2000)
- PNC Park (2001–present)

Steelers

- Forbes Field (1933–1963)
- Pitt Stadium (1958–1970)
- Three Rivers Stadium (1970–2000)
- Heinz Field/Acrisure Stadium (2001–present)

Penguins

- Civic/Mellon Arena (1967–2010)
- Consol Energy Center/PPG Paints Arena (2010–present)
