= Hutch Award =

American baseball award (created in 1965)

- Logo for the Hutch Award
- Awarded for: Best representing the honor, courage and dedication exemplified by Fred Hutchinson
- Location: Seattle, Washington, United States
- Presented by: Fred Hutchinson Cancer Research Center (1987–present); Dapper Dan Charities (1965–1986)

History
- First award: 1965
- Most recent: Anthony Fauci (2022) (honorary)
- Website: fredhutch.org

The Hutch Award is given annually to an active Major League Baseball (MLB) player who "best exemplifies the fighting spirit and competitive desire" of Fred Hutchinson, by persevering through adversity. The award was created in 1965 in honor of Hutchinson, the former MLB pitcher and manager, who died of lung cancer the previous year. The Hutch Award was created by Hutch's longtime friends Bob Prince, a broadcaster for the Pittsburgh Pirates and KDKA; Jim Enright, a Chicago sportswriter; and Ritter Collett, the sports editor of the Dayton Journal Herald. They also created a scholarship fund for medical students engaged in cancer research to honor Hutchinson's memory.

Fourteen members of the National Baseball Hall of Fame have won the Hutch Award. The inaugural winner was Mickey Mantle. Danny Thompson, the 1974 recipient, was diagnosed with leukemia earlier that year. He continued to play through the 1976 season before dying that December at the age of 29. Jon Lester won the award in 2008 after recovering from anaplastic large-cell lymphoma.

The award is presented annually at the Hutch Award Luncheon hosted by the Fred Hutchinson Cancer Research Center in Seattle, Washington, at Safeco Field. The award was originally presented at the annual Dapper Dan Banquet in Pittsburgh. Each winner receives a copy of the original trophy, designed by Dale Chihuly. The permanent display of the Hutch Award is at the National Baseball Hall of Fame in Cooperstown, New York, where it has been since 1979.

== Recipients ==
Key
†	Member of the Baseball Hall of Fame
‡	Denotes player who is still active

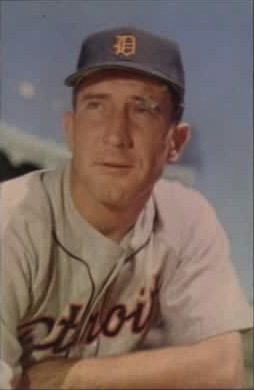
Fred Hutchinson, the award's namesake

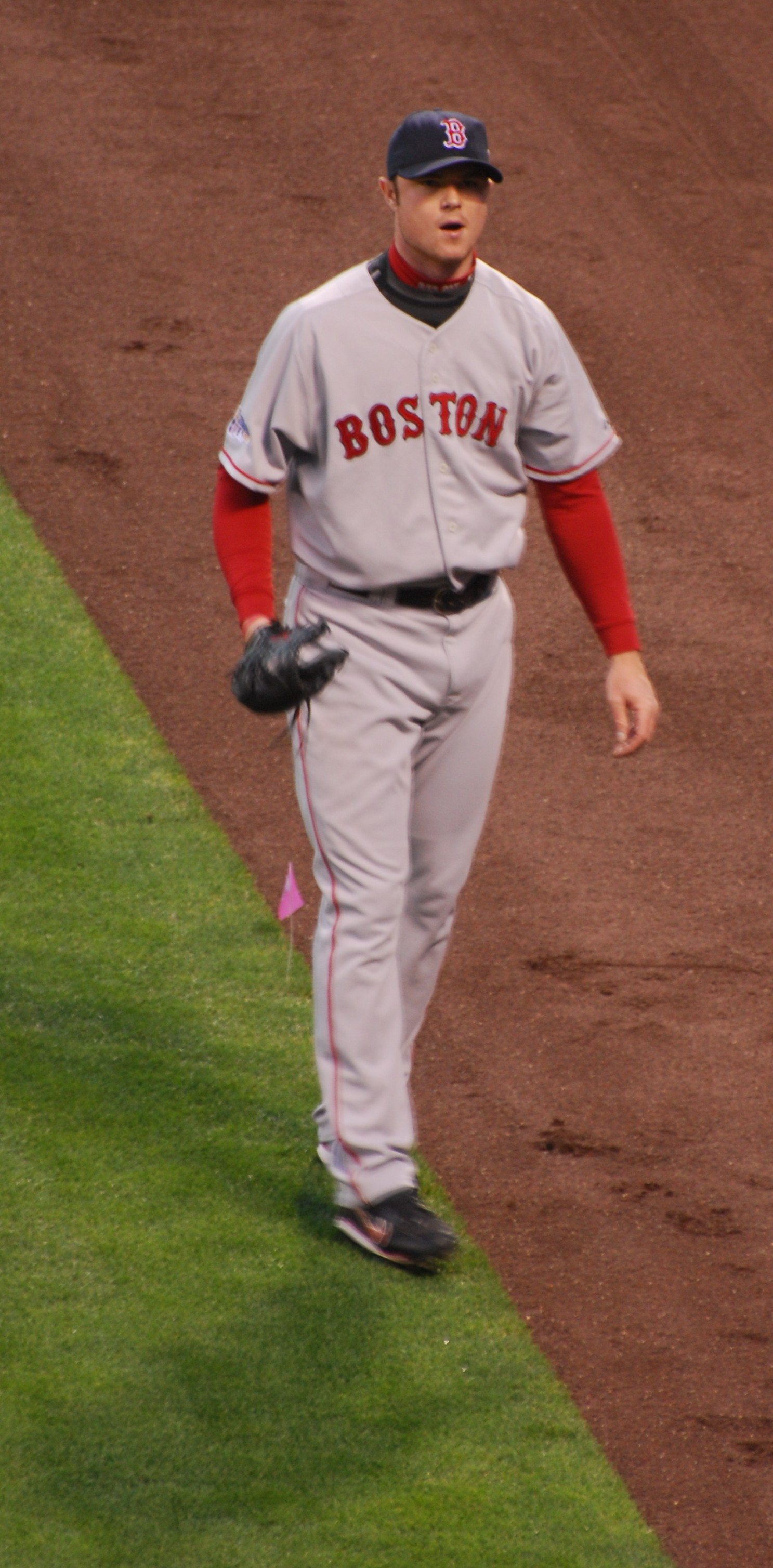
Jon Lester won the award after recovering from anaplastic large-cell lymphoma.

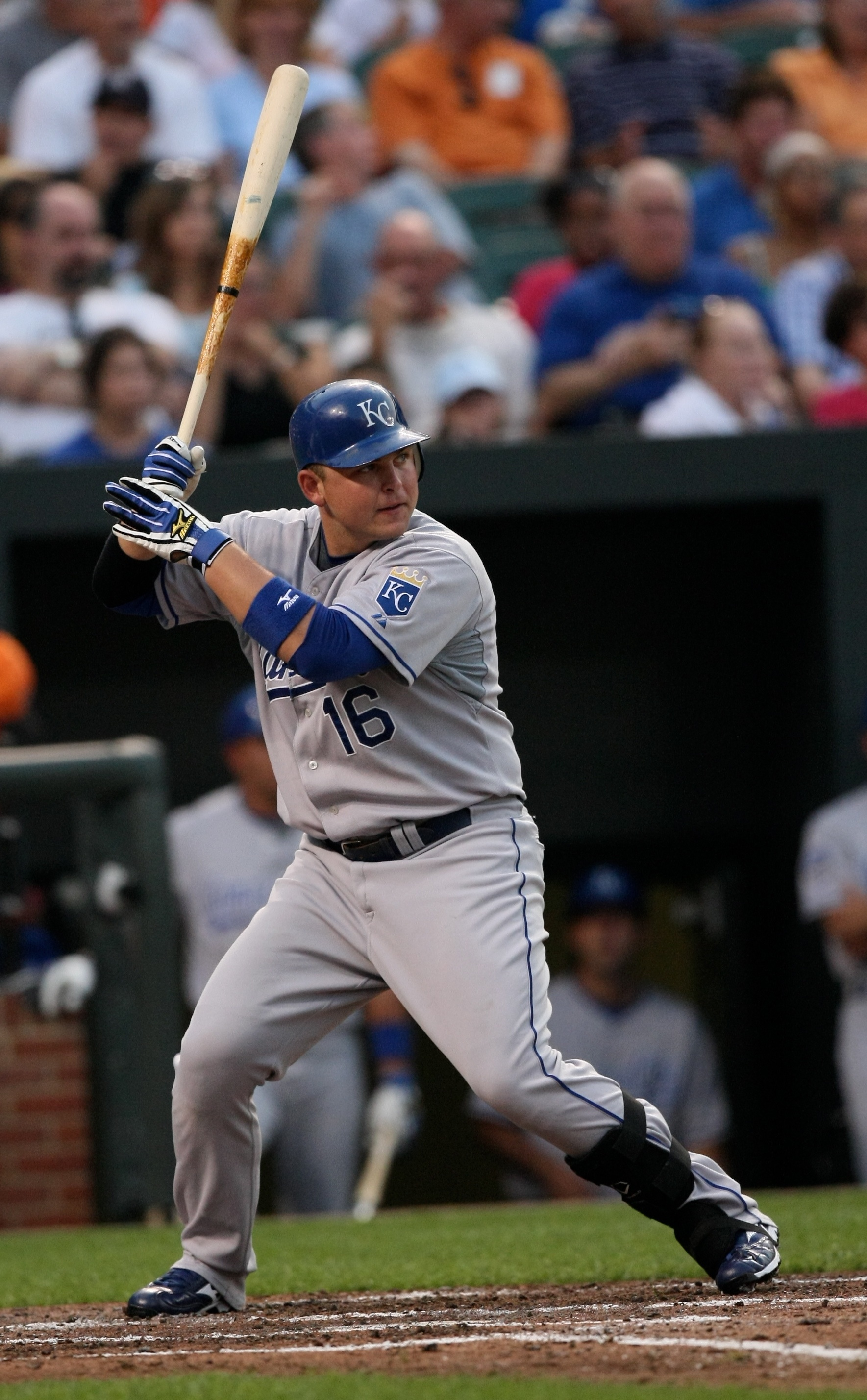
Billy Butler won the Hutch Award in 2011.

Recipients
Year (Note: An award for a given calendar year is usually presented early in the following year, resulting in media reports that use either year number (e.g., the 2015 Hutch Award was presented to Adam Wainwright at the 2016 Hutch Award Luncheon). This list shows the award year (not the presentation year, if different).)	Awardee	Team	Position	Ref
1965	Mickey Mantle^{†}	New York Yankees	Outfielder	
1966	Sandy Koufax^{†}	Los Angeles Dodgers	Pitcher	
1967	Carl Yastrzemski^{†}	Boston Red Sox	Outfielder	
1968	Pete Rose	Cincinnati Reds	Outfielder	
1969	Al Kaline^{†}	Detroit Tigers	Outfielder	
1970	Tony Conigliaro	Boston Red Sox	Outfielder	
1971	Joe Torre^{†}	St. Louis Cardinals	Third baseman	
1972	Bobby Tolan	Cincinnati Reds	Outfielder	
1973	John Hiller	Detroit Tigers	Pitcher	
1974	Danny Thompson	Minnesota Twins	Shortstop	
1975	Gary Nolan	Cincinnati Reds	Pitcher	
1976	Tommy John	Los Angeles Dodgers	Pitcher	
1977	Willie McCovey^{†}	San Francisco Giants	First baseman	
1978	Willie Stargell^{†}	Pittsburgh Pirates	Outfielder	
1979	Lou Brock^{†}	St. Louis Cardinals	Outfielder	
1980	George Brett^{†}	Kansas City Royals	Third baseman	
1981	Johnny Bench^{†}	Cincinnati Reds	Catcher	
1982	Andre Thornton	Cleveland Indians	First baseman	
1983	Ray Knight	Houston Astros	Third baseman	
1984	Don Robinson	Pittsburgh Pirates	Pitcher	
1985	Rick Reuschel	Pittsburgh Pirates	Pitcher	
1986	Dennis Leonard	Kansas City Royals	Pitcher	
1987	Paul Molitor^{†}	Milwaukee Brewers	Third baseman	
1988	Ron Oester	Cincinnati Reds	Second baseman	
1989	Dave Dravecky	San Francisco Giants	Pitcher	
1990	Sid Bream	Pittsburgh Pirates	First baseman	
1991	Bill Wegman	Milwaukee Brewers	Pitcher	
1992	Carney Lansford	Oakland Athletics	Third baseman	
1993	John Olerud	Toronto Blue Jays	First baseman	
1994	Andre Dawson^{†}	Boston Red Sox	Outfielder	
1995	Jim Abbott	California Angels	Pitcher	
1996	Omar Vizquel	Cleveland Indians	Shortstop	
1997	Eric Davis	Baltimore Orioles	Outfielder	
1998	David Cone	New York Yankees	Pitcher	
1999	Sean Casey	Cincinnati Reds	First baseman	
2000	Jason Giambi	Oakland Athletics	First baseman	
2001	Curt Schilling	Arizona Diamondbacks	Pitcher	
2002	Tim Salmon	Anaheim Angels	Outfielder	
2003	Jamie Moyer	Seattle Mariners	Pitcher	
2004	Trevor Hoffman^{†}	San Diego Padres	Pitcher	
2005	Craig Biggio^{†}	Houston Astros	Second baseman	
2006	Mark Loretta	Boston Red Sox	Second baseman	
2007	Mike Sweeney	Kansas City Royals	Designated hitter	
2008	Jon Lester	Boston Red Sox	Pitcher	
2009	Mark Teahen	Kansas City Royals	First baseman	
2010	Tim Hudson	Atlanta Braves	Pitcher	
2011	Billy Butler	Kansas City Royals	Designated hitter	
2012	Barry Zito	San Francisco Giants	Pitcher	
2013	Raúl Ibañez	Seattle Mariners	Outfielder	
2014	Alex Gordon	Kansas City Royals	Outfielder	
2015	Adam Wainwright	St. Louis Cardinals	Pitcher	
2015	Jimmy Carter (honorary)			(Note: Wainwright and Carter are listed together because their awards were presented at the same event.)
2016	Dustin McGowan	Miami Marlins	Pitcher	
2017	Jake Diekman	Texas Rangers	Pitcher	
2018	Stephen Piscotty	Oakland Athletics	Outfielder	
2019	Dee Gordon	Seattle Mariners	Second baseman	
2020	Not awarded			(Note: Due to the COVID-19 pandemic, the Hutch Award Luncheon was paused from 2020 to 2023.)
2021	Not awarded			(Note: Due to the COVID-19 pandemic, the Hutch Award Luncheon was paused from 2020 to 2023.)
2022	Anthony Fauci (honorary)			
2023	Not awarded			
2024	Not awarded			

== See also ==
- Heart & Hustle Award
- Willie Mac Award
- Baseball awards in the United States
- List of MLB awards
