= Ritter Collett =

American sportswriter (1921–2001)

Collett

Charles Ritter Collett (June 14, 1921 – September 25, 2001), known as Ritter Collett, was a sports editor and columnist for the Dayton Journal-Herald and Dayton Daily News for over 50 years.

Collett, a native of Ironton, Ohio, was the son of Katherine Ritter Collett and Charles L. Collett, the publisher of the Ironton Tribune. He began his career in 1946 for the then-Dayton Journal. After the Journal merged with the Herald in 1948, Collett became the sports editor for the Journal-Herald until 1986, when the paper merged with the Dayton Daily News, and he became sports editor and columnist for that paper.

Collett, along with Bob Prince and Jim Enright created the Hutch Award in honor of Cincinnati Reds manager Fred Hutchinson, awarded by Major League Baseball to an active player who best exemplifies the fighting spirit and competitive desire to win. Collett, a member of the Baseball Writers' Association of America since 1947, was awarded the J. G. Taylor Spink Award by the BBWAA in 1991.

Ritter died in September 2001, following neurosurgery.
