= Dapper Dan Open =

Golf tournament formerly on the PGA Tour

The Dapper Dan Open was a professional golf tournament on the PGA Tour that was played intermittently in the 1930s and 1940s. It was sponsored by Dapper Dan Charities, a Pittsburgh, Pennsylvania-based charitable organization founded in 1936 as a businessman's sports club by Pittsburgh Post-Gazette sports editor Al Abrams. Dapper Dan evolved into one of western Pennsylvania's premier sports charities with six fundraising events throughout the year, including Pittsburgh's oldest, largest and most prestigious annual sports banquet. The organization awarded its top honor to golfer Arnold Palmer in 1960.

Arnold Palmer's first ever PGA tournament was the Dapper Dan when he was just 16 years old.

The tournament was played at the Wildwood Country Club in Allison Park, Pennsylvania in 1939. After a break of nine years, the tournament resumed in 1948 at the Alcoma Country Club in Pittsburgh.

== Winners ==
Dapper Dan Open

- 1949 Sam Snead

Dapper Dan-Alcoma Tournament

- 1948 Vic Ghezzi

Dapper Dan Open

- 1940-47 No tournament
- 1939 Ralph Guldahl
