= Plum Creek (Allegheny River tributary) =

Location
- Country: United States

Physical characteristics
- Source
  - coordinates: 40.4728459°N 79.7489353°W
- Mouth
  - coordinates: 40.5075682°N 79.8472718°W
  - elevation: 728 ft (222 m)

Basin features
- River system: Allegheny River

Plum Creek is a tributary of the Allegheny River located in Allegheny County in the U.S. state of Pennsylvania. The stream was named for the plum trees lining its banks.

== Course ==
Plum Creek rises within the grounds of Boyce Park in Plum, Pennsylvania; it flows west forming part of the boundary with Penn Hills. The stream joins the Allegheny River in both Oakmont and Verona boroughs.

=== Tributaries ===
(Mouth at the Allegheny River)

- Bodies Run
- Little Plum Creek

== See also ==
- List of rivers of Pennsylvania
- List of tributaries of the Allegheny River
