= City Game =

American college basketball rivalry

The City Game Pitt Panthers–Duquesne Dukes
Men's History
First meeting	January 13, 1932
Last Meeting	November 30, 2018
Last Result	PITT: 74–53
Next Meeting	TBA
Number of Meetings	87
All-Time Series	PITT: 55–32
Largest victory	Duquesne, 100–66 (12/9/1967)
Current Streak	PITT: Won 2
Longest Streak	Pitt, 15 (12/22/2001–12/4/2015)
Women's History
First meeting	December 6, 1974
Last Meeting	December 21, 2025
Last Result	Duquesne: 84–69
Next Meeting	TBA
Number of Meetings	41
All-Time Series	PITT: 22–19
Largest victory	Pitt, 91–32 (12/6/1974)
Current Streak	Duquesne: Won 2
Longest Win Streak	Pitt, 13 (12/6/1974–11/30/1994)

Locations of University of Pittsburgh and Duquesne University (2.1 miles apart.)

The City Game is an annual college basketball game between the University of Pittsburgh Panthers and the Duquesne University Dukes. The term "City Game" is also used refer to women's basketball games played annually between the two universities and may also be used to refer to other athletic competitions between the two schools.

== History ==
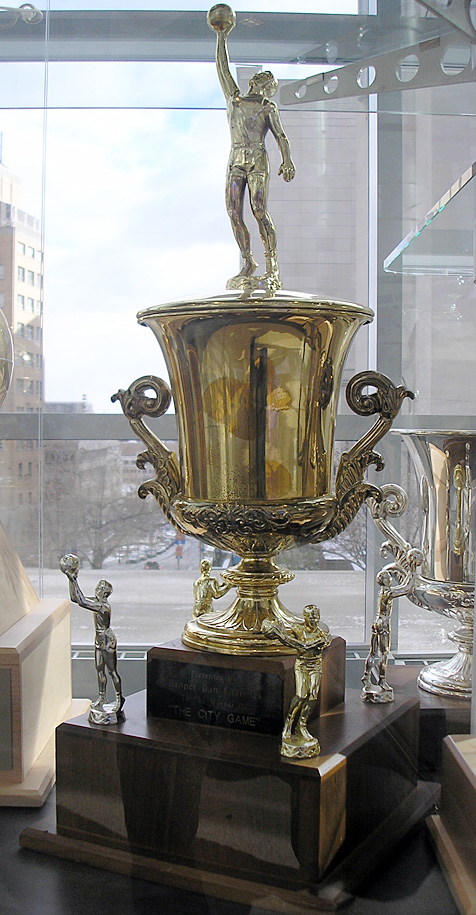
The City Game trophy, presented to the winner by Dapper Dan Charities of Pittsburgh

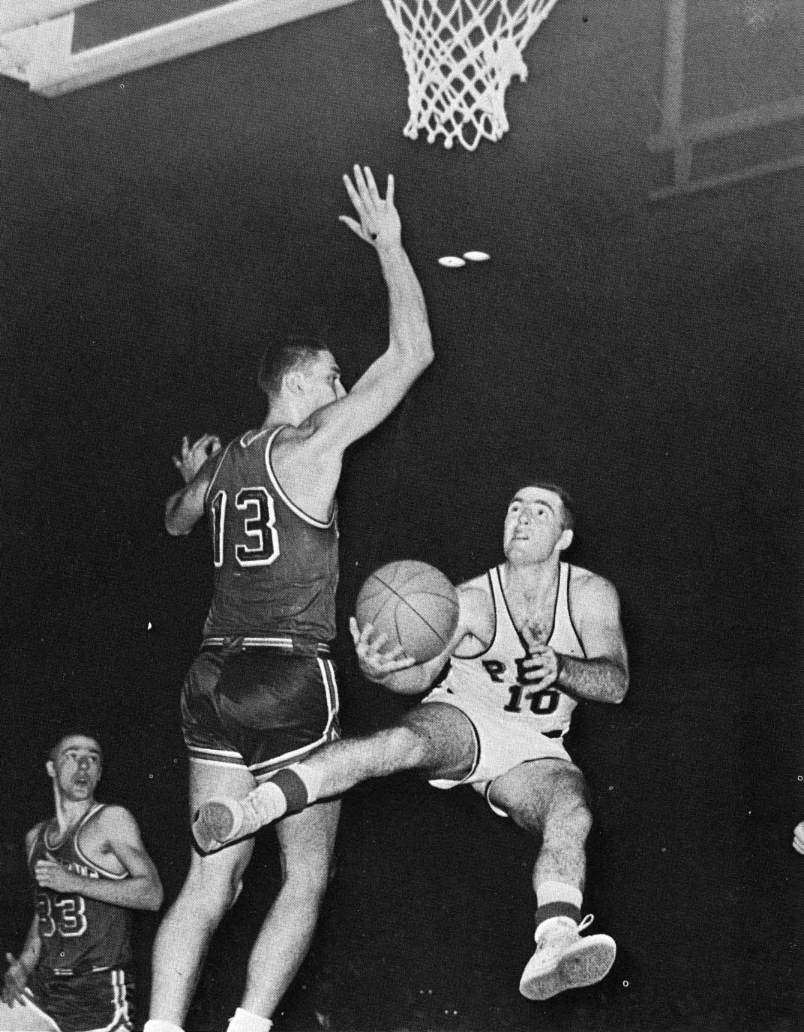
The University of Pittsburgh's Don Hennon drives around Duquesne University's Bob Slobodnik during a Pitt victory on December 13, 1958

The basketball series was first played in 1932. The cross-town rivalry between the two schools intensified quickly, and the development of bad blood between the two schools on the basketball court and in the boxing ring led to the cessation of series following the 1939 game until it was renewed in 1953. The teams met various times in the Steel Bowl tournament, an in-season four-team tournament sponsored by U.S. Steel that was held from 1951 through 1976 in Pittsburgh.

The rivalry reached its peak when both schools again found themselves members of the same athletic conference, the Eastern 8 (originally named the Eastern Collegiate Basketball League in its first season of 1976–77, formally the Eastern Athletic Association, and renamed the Atlantic 10 Conference following the 1981–82 season), from 1976 to 1982. During this period, the head coaches of Pitt and Duquesne, Tim Grgurich and Mike Rice respectively, were alumni of their schools and had played against each other in the 1960s. There was genuine dislike between coaches and players, and during these contests fights frequently broke out between players, and sometimes among fans. The series of games between the schools during the years that both were members of the Eastern 8 was won by Pitt 9–7. Duquesne and Pitt have met once in post-season play, not including two Eastern 8 Tournament games, which resulted in a 65–63 Duquesne victory over the Panthers in the first round of the 1980 NIT at the Civic Arena.

However, the competitiveness of the series has waned since Pitt left for the Big East Conference beginning in the 1982–83 season as Pitt has now won 32 of the last 35 games. The men's basketball series is currently on hiatus, having last been played in 2018. It is unknown when the series will resume, as there have been disputes about the scheduling terms, including the venue.

== Location ==
The location of the City Game has varied between both on-campus and off-campus venues for both schools and throughout their history, they have also shared venues to use as their home floor. Both Pittsburgh and Duquesne used the Pitt Pavilion, located inside of Pitt Stadium, for their home games until January 28, 1939 when Pitt's director of athletics Jimmy Hagan announced a cessation of basketball relations with Duquesne following the development of bad blood between the schools on the court. The series returned in 1953 at Pitt's home floor, Fitzgerald Field House, that had opened in 1951. This facility on the campus of the University of Pittsburgh would serve as the home floor of the Panthers through the opening of the Petersen Events Center in 2002, although Pitt played select home games at the Pittsburgh Civic Arena in the 1980s and 1990s. Duquesne also used Fitzgerald Field House as its home floor following the demolition of its home court, Duquesne Gardens, in 1956. Duquesne began playing games in the Civic Arena as early as December 1961 and subsequently switched to using the Civic Arena as its primary home floor between 1964 and 1988. Duquesne moved into a new on-campus home at the A. J. Palumbo Center beginning in the 1988–89 season. From 1990 to 2001, the series was back to being played at the Civic Arena/Mellon Arena. The series then rotated on a yearly basis between the on-campus venues of the Petersen Events Center and the A. J. Palumbo Center.

In 2009, the game returned to Mellon Arena and was the last basketball game played at that venue (not counting a Harlem Globetrotters game on December 26, 2009). Pitt rallied from trailing by 16 to winning 67–58 in double overtime. It was the first multiple overtime game in the series' history.

Upon the opening of the PPG Paints Arena in 2010, the game will be held annually at that site. Each team has an exclusive locker room in the new facility.

== Men's game results ==
Duquesne victories	Pittsburgh victories

No.	Date	Location	Winner	Score
1	January 13, 1932	Pitt Pavilion	Duquesne	28–21
2	January 13, 1933	Pitt Pavilion	Duquesne	26–25
3	February 17, 1933	Pitt Pavilion	Duquesne	25–24
4	January 12, 1934	Pitt Pavilion	Duquesne	30–29
5	February 6, 1934	Pitt Pavilion	Pittsburgh	31–29
6	January 4, 1935	Pitt Pavilion	Duquesne	27–25
7	February 8, 1935	Pitt Pavilion	Pittsburgh	35–34
8	February 8, 1936	Pitt Pavilion	Duquesne	54–42
9	February 18, 1936	Pitt Pavilion	Pittsburgh	46–41
10	February 10, 1937	Pitt Pavilion	Pittsburgh	51–50
11	February 24, 1937	Pitt Pavilion	Duquesne	32–31 (Note: This game is listed as a Duquesne victory with a score of 31–30 in the Pitt media guide.)
12	January 12, 1938	Pitt Pavilion	Pittsburgh	35–28
13	February 23, 1938	Pitt Pavilion	Duquesne	39–37
14	January 28, 1939	Pitt Pavilion	Duquesne	40–29
15	December 12, 1953	Fitzgerald Field House	Duquesne	79–43 (Note: This game is listed as a Duquesne victory with a score of 75–46 in the Pitt media guide.)
16	December 10, 1955	Fitzgerald Field House	Duquesne	71–49
17	December 15, 1956	Fitzgerald Field House	Pittsburgh	59–50
18	December 14, 1957	Fitzgerald Field House	Duquesne	81–64
19	December 13, 1958	Fitzgerald Field House	Pittsburgh	71–56
20	December 12, 1959	Fitzgerald Field House	Pittsburgh	75–44
21	December 17, 1960	Fitzgerald Field House	Duquesne	80–66
22	December 16, 1961	Fitzgerald Field House	Duquesne	73–70
23	December 15, 1962	Fitzgerald Field House	Pittsburgh	85–59
24	December 7, 1963	Fitzgerald Field House	Pittsburgh	69–67^{OT}
25	December 10, 1966	Civic Arena	Duquesne	72–65
26	December 9, 1967	Civic Arena	Duquesne	100–66
27	December 7, 1968	Civic Arena	Duquesne	57–42
28	December 29, 1970	Civic Arena	Pittsburgh	70–58
29	December 30, 1971	Civic Arena	Duquesne	87–67
30	December 8, 1972	Civic Arena	Duquesne	67–61
31	December 7, 1973	Civic Arena	Pittsburgh	82–65
32	December 6, 1974	Civic Arena	Duquesne	100–94
33	December 5, 1975	Civic Arena	Duquesne	75–74
34	December 11, 1976	Civic Arena	Duquesne	79–78
35	February 12, 1977	Fitzgerald Field House	Duquesne	66–63^{OT}
36	February 27, 1977	Civic Arena	Pittsburgh	64–56
37	February 5, 1978	Civic Arena	Duquesne	88–66
38	February 22, 1978	Fitzgerald Field House	Pittsburgh	72–65
39	February 1, 1979	Civic Arena	Pittsburgh	89–83
40	February 17, 1979	Fitzgerald Field House	Pittsburgh	60–54
41	January 16, 1980	Fitzgerald Field House	Pittsburgh	55–53
42	February 10, 1980	Civic Arena	Duquesne	67–66
43	March 6, 1980	Civic Arena	Duquesne	65–63
44	February 4, 1981	Fitzgerald Field House	Pittsburgh	60–53

No.	Date	Location	Winner	Score
45	February 15, 1981	Civic Arena	Duquesne	66–64
46	March 7, 1981	Civic Arena	Pittsburgh	64–60
47	January 14, 1982	Fitzgerald Field House	Duquesne	72–62
48	February 14, 1982	Civic Arena	Pittsburgh	69–68
49	March 2, 1982	Fitzgerald Field House	Pittsburgh	66–64
50	November 30, 1982	Civic Arena	Pittsburgh	62–53
51	December 27, 1983	Civic Arena	Pittsburgh	64–59
52	January 14, 1984	Fitzgerald Field House	Pittsburgh	75–69
53	February 4, 1985	Civic Arena	Pittsburgh	77–61
54	January 20, 1986	Fitzgerald Field House	Pittsburgh	95–76
55	January 12, 1987	Civic Arena	Pittsburgh	102–77
56	January 11, 1988	Fitzgerald Field House	Pittsburgh	85–58
57	December 19, 1988	Palumbo Center	Duquesne	80–76
58	December 18, 1989	Fitzgerald Field House	Pittsburgh	92–87
59	December 19, 1990	Civic Arena	Pittsburgh	84–65
60	January 6, 1992	Civic Arena	Pittsburgh	93–69
61	December 19, 1992	Civic Arena	Pittsburgh	102–91
62	December 30, 1993	Civic Arena	Pittsburgh	77–66
63	December 19, 1994	Civic Arena	Pittsburgh	76–72
64	November 29, 1995	Civic Arena	Pittsburgh	84–73 (Note: This game is listed as a Pittsburgh victory with a score of 84–74 in the Duquesne media guide.)
65	December 21, 1996	Civic Arena	Pittsburgh	75–73
66	February 5, 1998	Civic Arena	Duquesne	80–69
67	January 25, 1999	Mellon Arena	Pittsburgh	65–60
68	December 20, 1999	Mellon Arena	Pittsburgh	74–56
69	December 21, 2000	Mellon Arena	Duquesne	71–70
70	December 22, 2001	Mellon Arena	Pittsburgh	78–63
71	November 23, 2002	Petersen Events Center	Pittsburgh	82–67
72	December 3, 2003	Palumbo Center	Pittsburgh	59–45
73	December 4, 2004	Petersen Events Center	Pittsburgh	87–57
74	December 7, 2005	Palumbo Center	Pittsburgh	71–60
75	December 6, 2006	Petersen Events Center	Pittsburgh	73–56
76	December 5, 2007	Palumbo Center	Pittsburgh	73–68
77	December 3, 2008	Petersen Events Center	Pittsburgh	78–51
78	December 2, 2009	Mellon Arena	Pittsburgh	67–58^{2OT}
79	December 1, 2010	Consol Energy Center	Pittsburgh	80–66
80	November 30, 2011	Consol Energy Center	Pittsburgh	80–69
81	December 5, 2012	Consol Energy Center	Pittsburgh	66–45
82	November 30, 2013	Consol Energy Center	Pittsburgh	84–67
83	December 5, 2014	Consol Energy Center	Pittsburgh	76–62
84	December 4, 2015	Consol Energy Center	Pittsburgh	96–75
85	December 2, 2016	PPG Paints Arena	Duquesne	64–55
86	December 1, 2017	PPG Paints Arena	Pittsburgh	76–64
87	November 30, 2018	PPG Paints Arena	Pittsburgh	74–53
Series: Pittsburgh leads 55–32

Where there are discrepancies between game scores, the score provided in the table is the one provided by sources from the winning team.

== Women's basketball ==
The women's basketball City Game series dates to 1974 when the University of Pittsburgh resurrected its women's varsity athletic program. The Pitt women's 91–32 win against Duquesne in the 1974 Pitt Tournament marked its first game and victory of the modern era since the program had been on hiatus at the close of the 1926–1927 season. Including the 1974 win, Pitt dominated the early series winning the first 13 games. The game has sometimes been played as a double header with the men's game and has been played three times at the Civic Arena in 1995, 1996, and 1998. Pitt leads the series 22–19.

== Baseball ==
The baseball contest between the University of Pittsburgh and Duquesne University was often referred to as the baseball version of the City Game and was sometimes played at special venues including Major League Baseball's PNC Park. The first collegiate baseball game at PNC Park was played on May 6, 2003, between Pittsburgh and Duquesne. Duquesne won the game by a score of 2–1. Following the 2010 season, Duquesne discontinued its varsity baseball program, bringing the City Game baseball series to an end. The PNC Park City Game series ended in Pitt's favor, four games to two, with the 2007 game canceled because of poor field conditions. The final City Game baseball series was split with Pitt winning an April 14, 2010 game at Trees Field 21–9, and Duquesne, oddly serving as the home team at Pitt's Trees Field, winning the final meeting, 10–9, on May 12, 2010. The all-time series between the schools ended in Pitt's favor, 58–22–1.

== Men's soccer ==
Duquesne victories	Pittsburgh victories

No.	Date	Location	Winner	Score
1	August 31, 1996	Founder's Field	Pittsburgh	1–0
2	October 29, 1997	Rooney Field	Pittsburgh	3–1
3	September 4, 1998	Founder's Field	Tie	0–0
4	October 6, 1999	Rooney Field	Pittsburgh	2–0
5	September 13, 2000	Founder's Field	Pittsburgh	3–0
6	September 12, 2001 (Note: This match was cancelled due to the September 11 attacks.)	Rooney Field	None	–

No.	Date	Location	Winner	Score
7	October 17, 2007	Founder's Field	Pittsburgh	3–1
8	September 4, 2008	Rooney Field	Tie	0–0
9	September 7, 2010 (Note: This match was suspended due to severe weather.)	Rooney Field	None	–
10	September 16, 2011	Urbanic Field	Pittsburgh	1–0
11	September 16, 2012	Rooney Field	Pittsburgh	2–1
Series: Pittsburgh leads 7–0–2

== Football ==
Duquesne victories	Pittsburgh victories	Tie games

No.	Date	Location	Winner	Score
1	October 26, 1901	Schenley Park	W.U.P.	18–0
2	October 20, 1903 (Note: Pitt's (W.U.P.'s) opponent on October 20, 1903 played under the name of Manchester Athletic Club, but used players mainly from Pittsburgh College of the Holy Ghost (later to be known as Duquesne University). The University of Pittsburgh lists its opponent that day as Manchester A.C. (and does not count the game toward its all-time record vs. Duquesne), while Duquesne counts the game as its own.)	Colosseum	Pittsburgh College	10–6
3	October 8, 1932	Pitt Stadium	Pittsburgh	33–0
4	November 11, 1933	Pitt Stadium	Pittsburgh	7–0
5	October 17, 1936	Pitt Stadium	Duquesne	7–0
6	October 9, 1937	Pitt Stadium	Pittsburgh	6–0
7	October 8, 1938	Pitt Stadium	Pittsburgh	27–0
8	October 21, 1939	Pitt Stadium	Duquesne	21–13
9	August 30, 2025	Acrisure Stadium	Pittsburgh	61–9
Series: Pittsburgh leads 6–3

== See also ==
- Sports in Pittsburgh
- College rivalry
- List of NCAA college football rivalry games
