= Pittsburgh Great Race =

Annual foot race in Pittsburgh, Pennsylvania, U.S.

- Date: Last Sunday in September (annually)
- Location: Pittsburgh, PA, United States
- Event type: Road
- Distance: 10k
- Established: 1977
- Website: http://www.rungreatrace.com/

The Richard S. Caliguiri City of Pittsburgh Great Race, known most commonly as the Great Race, is a major 10 kilometer foot race organized and operated annually by the City of Pittsburgh Department of Parks and Recreation (Citiparks) in Pittsburgh, Pennsylvania, in the United States. It was named in honor of former mayor of Pittsburgh Richard S. Caliguiri.

== History ==
Established in 1977, this race has been held the last Sunday of September each year except 2003, when Pittsburgh's city government faced financial difficulty.

Since the revival of the Pittsburgh Marathon in 2009, participation in the Great Race has increased dramatically, meeting registration caps enacted to limit the total number of runners. By 2010, the race was considered the largest 10k race in Pennsylvania and tenth largest in the United States.

A 5k race immediately precedes the 10k race, which essentially follows the second half of the 10k course. Both races finish at the same location in Point State Park in downtown Pittsburgh.

By 2014, nearly 16,000 runners were registered between the 5k and 10k races, and in 2015 the race is capped at 11,000 runners in the 10k course and 5,500 runners in the 5k course for a total of 16,500 entrants.

Beginning at the foot of Frick Park, the course of the Great Race leads through some of Pittsburgh's best-known neighborhoods, including Squirrel Hill, Oakland, The Bluff (Uptown), and Downtown. Runners pass the three largest universities in Pittsburgh during the race, Carnegie Mellon, University of Pittsburgh, and Duquesne.

Finishing roughly 400 feet below the start line, except for notable climbs in the first and fifth miles, the course is predominantly downhill, enabling a competitive race.
