= Printscape Arena at Southpointe =

Multi-purpose dual arena facility in Washington County, Pennsylvania

- Interactive map of Printscape Arena at Southpointe
- Former names: Iceoplex at Southpointe (1995–2017)
- Location: 114 Southpointe Boulevard; Canonsburg, Pennsylvania, U.S.
- Coordinates: 40°16′40.5″N 80°9′41.5″W
- Owner: Piney Ice Holdings
- Surface: Ice, turf, sport court
- Field size: 65,000 sq ft (6,000 m^{2})

Construction
- Opened: May 20, 1995
- Renovated: 2017

Tenants
- Pittsburgh Penguins (NHL, practice facility) (1995–2015); Burgh Defenders (AAL) (2019)

Website
- www.printscapearena.com

Printscape Arena at Southpointe (formerly the IceoPlex at Southpointe) is a multi-purpose dual arena facility located at exit 48 of Interstate 79 in the Pittsburgh business park of Southpointe in Cecil Township, Washington County, Pennsylvania, United States. It served as the practice facility for the Pittsburgh Penguins from opening on May 20, 1995, until 2015.

The arena opened in 1995 as the Iceoplex at Southpointe, with Pittsburgh Penguins owner Howard Baldwin as one of the leaders in the project. Upon its opening, American Figure Skating Champion Suzy Semanick worked as a skating instructor and David Hanson was as general manager. In 2000, former Pittsburgh Steelers Robin Cole led a group of investors who attempted to purchase the Iceoplex to turn it into a community center. In 2011, the owners, Southpointe Rink Associates, placed the facility for sale, asking $11 million.

The facility employs about 15 full-time people and up to 50 total during peak season.

The building is also used for many youth/adult and recreational programs such as ice hockey, figure skating, baseball, softball, lacrosse, roller hockey, indoor soccer, volleyball, and basketball as well as a summer activities camp program. The arena is also joined with a health club called the Southpointe Fitness Center, and the restaurant Bubbas Burghers. The building also hosts a successful adult hockey league containing approximately 50 teams during any session playing every night of the week.

In addition to recreational sports, the arena also has a corporate meeting room, party rooms and has started renting their recreational/dry arena for trade show/ large event use.

The Penguins new purpose-built practice facility, the UPMC Lemieux Sports Complex, opened in Cranberry Township north of Pittsburgh in August 2015.

The Iceoplex at Southpointe was purchased by Piney Ice Holdings Management company in January 2017. As of late 2017, Printscape printing company owns the naming rights for the facility and was renamed Printscape Arena at Southpointe.
