= Pittsburgh Open (LPGA Tour) =

Golf tournament formerly on the LPGA Tour

The Pittsburgh Open was a golf tournament on the LPGA Tour, played only in 1956. It was played at the Churchill Valley Country Club in Pittsburgh, Pennsylvania. Marlene Hagge won the event.
