= Boyce Park =

Park in the U.S. state of Pennsylvania

- Location within Pennsylvania Location within the United States
- Type: Municipal
- Location: Allegheny County, Pennsylvania
- Coordinates: 40°27′56″N 79°44′43″W
- Area: 1,096-acre (4.44 km^{2})
- Created: 1963

Boyce Park is a 1,096-acre (4.44 km^{2}) county park lying mostly in the Borough of Plum, in eastern Allegheny County, Pennsylvania, United States. It is a part of the county's 12,000-acre (49 km^{2}) network of nine distinct parks. Its southernmost reaches (south of Old Frankstown Road) also extend into neighboring Monroeville.

== History ==
Established in 1963, it is named for William D. Boyce, the founder of the Boy Scouts of America, who was born in the area. It is sited 15 miles (24 km) east of downtown Pittsburgh. It is the only park in the county for downhill skiing, with ski lifts and a lodge. It also offers a wave pool, tennis courts, ball fields, a nature center, greenhouse, arboretum and trails. The source of Plum Creek is in the northwest section of the park.
