= Dapper Dan Charities =

The Dapper Dan Charities were founded by Pittsburgh Post-Gazette editor Al Abrams in 1936. It is one of the oldest nonprofit and fundraising community sports clubs in the world and the oldest in Western Pennsylvania. The foundation fundraises for its charities primarily through the annual "Dapper Dan Banquet". Started in 1936, the first few banquets honored such regional figures as Art Rooney, Jock Sutherland and John Harris. In 1939, the banquet began an annual tradition of naming the region's "Sportsman of the Year" and in 1999 the "Sportswoman of the Year". In recent decades, all charitable contributions raised by the banquet go to the Boys and Girls club of Western Pennsylvania, which directly funds activities and equipment for nearly 7,000 youths annually. The organization also sponsored the annual Dapper Dan Wrestling Classic.

Previous fundraisers included the occasional Dapper Dan Open golf tournament in the 1930s and 1940s, World Heavyweight Titles hosted at Forbes Field in the 1950s and 1960s and the Roundball Classic hosted at the Civic Arena from 1965 until the 1980s.

Through Pittsburgh Pirates broadcaster Bob Prince's friendship with Fred Hutchinson the Dapper Dan Charity awarded Major League Baseball's annual Hutch Award at the annual banquet until at least 1993.

== Dapper Dan awards ==
Year	Sportsman	Sport or Team	Sportswoman	Sport or Team	Lifetime Achievement	Sport or Team	Venue
1939	Billy Conn	boxing					William Penn Hotel
1940	Fritzie Zivic	boxing					William Penn
1941	Aldo Donelli	Steelers					William Penn
1942	Bill Dudley	Steelers					William Penn
1943	Rip Sewell	Pirates					William Penn
1944	Frankie Frisch	Pirates					William Penn
1945	Billy Conn	boxing					William Penn
1946	Bill Dudley	Steelers					William Penn
1947	Ralph Kiner	Pirates					William Penn
1948	Bill Meyer	Pirates					William Penn
1949	Ralph Kiner	Pirates					William Penn
1950	Joe Geri	Steelers					William Penn
1951	Murry Dickson	Pirates					William Penn
1952	Red Dawson	Panthers					William Penn
1952	Stan Musial	Cardinals					William Penn
1953	Lew Worsham	golf					William Penn
1954	Dudley Moore	Dukes					William Penn
1955	John Michelosen	Steelers					William Penn
1956	Dale Long	Pirates					Penn-Sheraton
1957	Dick Groat	Pirates					Penn-Sheraton
1958	Danny Murtaugh	Pirates					Penn-Sheraton
1959	Elroy Face	Pirates					Hilton
1960	Arnold Palmer	golf					Hilton
1960	Dick Groat	Pirates					Hilton
1961	Roberto Clemente	Pirates					Hilton
1962	Lou Michaels	Steelers					Hilton
1963	John Michelosen	Steelers					
1964	Delvin Miller	horse racing					
1965	Vernon Law	Pirates					Hilton
1966	Roberto Clemente	Pirates					
1967	Baz Bastien	Penguins					
1968	Steve Blass	Pirates					
1968	Dick Hoak	Steelers					
1969	Red Manning	Dukes					
1970	Danny Murtaugh	Pirates					
1971	Willie Stargell	Pirates					
1971	Danny Murtaugh	Pirates					
1971	Roberto Clemente	Pirates					
1972	Chuck Noll	Steelers					
1973	Johnny Majors	Panthers					
1974	Joe Greene	Steelers					Hilton
1975	Terry Bradshaw	Steelers					
1976	Tony Dorsett	Panthers					
1977	Franco Harris	Steelers					
1978	Dave Parker	Pirates					Hilton
1979	Willie Stargell	Pirates			Stan Musial	Cardinals	Hilton
1980	Hugh Green	Panthers					
1981	Jackie Sherrill	Panthers			Art Rooney	Steelers	Hilton
1982	Joe Paterno	Lions			Joe Schmidt	Pitt	Hilton
1983	Dan Marino	Panthers			Franco Harris	Steelers	Hilton
1984	John Stallworth	Steelers					Hilton
1985	Louis Lipps	Steelers			Bill Dudley	Steelers	Hilton
1986	Mario Lemieux	Penguins					Hilton
1987	Syd Thrift	Pirates					
1988	Mario Lemieux	Penguins					Hilton
1989	Roger Kingdom	Panthers (track)					Hilton
1990	Jim Leyland	Pirates					Hilton
1991	Bob Johnson	Penguins					Hilton
1992	Bill Cowher	Steelers					Hilton
1993	Jay Bell	Pirates					
1994	Bill Cowher	Steelers					
1995	Jaromír Jágr	Penguins					
1996	Kurt Angle	wrestling					Hilton
1997	Jerome Bettis	Steelers					Hilton
1998	Joe Paterno	Lions					Hilton
1999	Mario Lemieux	Penguins	Suzie McConnell-Serio	Rockers/Oakland Catholic	Dan Marino	Pitt	Hilton
2000	Jason Kendall	Pirates	Dori Anderson	Blackhawk High	Mike Ditka	Aliquippa	Hilton
2001	Kordell Stewart	Steelers	Carol Semple Thompson	golf	Chuck Noll	Steelers	Hilton
2002	Ben Howland	Panthers	Swin Cash	UConn Huskies	Lanny Frattare	Pirates	Hilton
2003	Larry Fitzgerald	Panthers	Kelly Mazzante	Lady Lions	The 1979 Champion Teams	Pirates; Steelers	Hilton
2004	Ben Roethlisberger	Steelers	Lauryn Williams	olympics	Arnold Palmer	Golf	Convention Center
2005	Jerome Bettis	Steelers	Agnus Berenato	Panthers	Joe Paterno	Penn State	Hilton
2006	Sidney Crosby	Penguins	Swin Cash	Detroit Shock	Dan Rooney	Steelers	Convention Center
2007	Sidney Crosby	Penguins	Agnus Benerato	Panthers	(None bestowed)		Convention Center
2008	Mike Tomlin	Steelers	Shavonte Zellous	Panthers	Dick LeBeau	Football	Petersen Events Center
2009	Evgeni Malkin	Penguins	Penn State Volleyball	Lions	Bruno Sammartino	wrestling	Petersen Events Center
2010	Jamie Dixon	Panthers	Suzie McConnell-Serio	Dukes	Joe Greene	Steelers	Convention Center
2011	Dan Bylsma, Marc-André Fleury	Penguins	Pittsburgh Passion	Women's football	Mike Ditka	Panthers	Convention Center
2012	Andrew McCutchen	Pirates	Taylor Schram	PSU Women's soccer	Hines Ward	Steelers	Convention Center
2013	Clint Hurdle	Pirates	Patrice Matamoros	Pittsburgh Marathon	Franco Harris	Steelers	Convention Center
2014	Antonio Brown	Steelers	Christa Harmotto	Penn State (Volleyball)	Jim Kelly	Football	Convention Center
2015	Antonio Brown	Steelers	Meghan Klingenberg	United States women's national soccer team	Dick Groat	Pitt basketball (broadcasting)	Convention Center
2016	Mike Sullivan and Jim Rutherford	Penguins	Amanda Polk	Oakland Catholic/Olympics	Rocky Bleier	Steelers	Convention Center
2017	James Conner	Steelers	Heather Lyke	Pitt Panthers	Jerome Bettis	Steelers	Convention Center
2018	Cam Heyward	Steelers	Pitt Panthers Women's Volleyball	Pitt Panthers	Bill Hillgrove	Pitt Panthers	Westin Hotel

== Banquet festivities ==
Various years the Dapper Dan Banquet has been a who's who of Western Pennsylvania sports, and attracted national and even international stars and entertainers. In 1993 George Wendt and David Lander hosted the event. Howard Baldwin, Craig Patrick, Lanny Frattare, Marty Schottenheimer, Rod Woodson, Ambassador Dan Rooney, Art Rooney, Mark May, John Brown, Sal Sunseri, Hank Aaron, Myron Cope, Lou Holtz, Terry Francona, Pat Mullins, Dave Robinson, Len Dawson, Lou Groza, Bud Wilkinson, Bob Prince, Governor Lawrence and Todd Blackledge have all participated in recent events.
