= Pittsburgh Three Rivers Regatta =

Annual motorboat and river festival held in Pittsburgh, Pennsylvania, United States

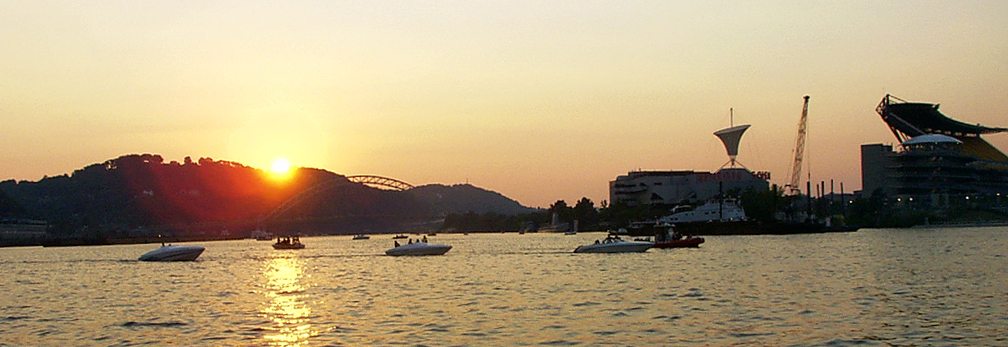
View of the 2002 Pittsburgh Three Rivers Regatta.

The Pittsburgh Three Rivers Regatta, named for the confluence of the Allegheny, Monongahela and Ohio Rivers at Pittsburgh, is an annual motorboat and river festival held in Pittsburgh, Pennsylvania, United States. The festival was first held in 1978 and is often host to an F1 ChampBoat Series race. The F1 race, originally held in 1982, was the first F1 power boat race held in the United States. 2008 saw the return of F1 Power Boat racing at the Pittsburgh Regatta after a two-year hiatus following the 2005 festival. The festival had been scheduled to coincide with the July 4th holiday, however 2016 saw a return to the Regatta being held prior in early August, as it traditionally was prior to 2004. The festival is the largest inland regatta in the United States, drawing tens of thousands of fans along the Allegheny River. The F1 race course consists of a 4-pin 1.25 mile (2 km) course. In 2008, the Pittsburgh regatta F1 ChampBoat race was nationally broadcast on the Speed Channel.

The Regatta is the annual continuation of the original speed boat and paddle wheeler races of the "Pittsburgh Welcome Week Regatta" held annually starting on May 21, 1949, and through the mid-1950s.

== Festival ==
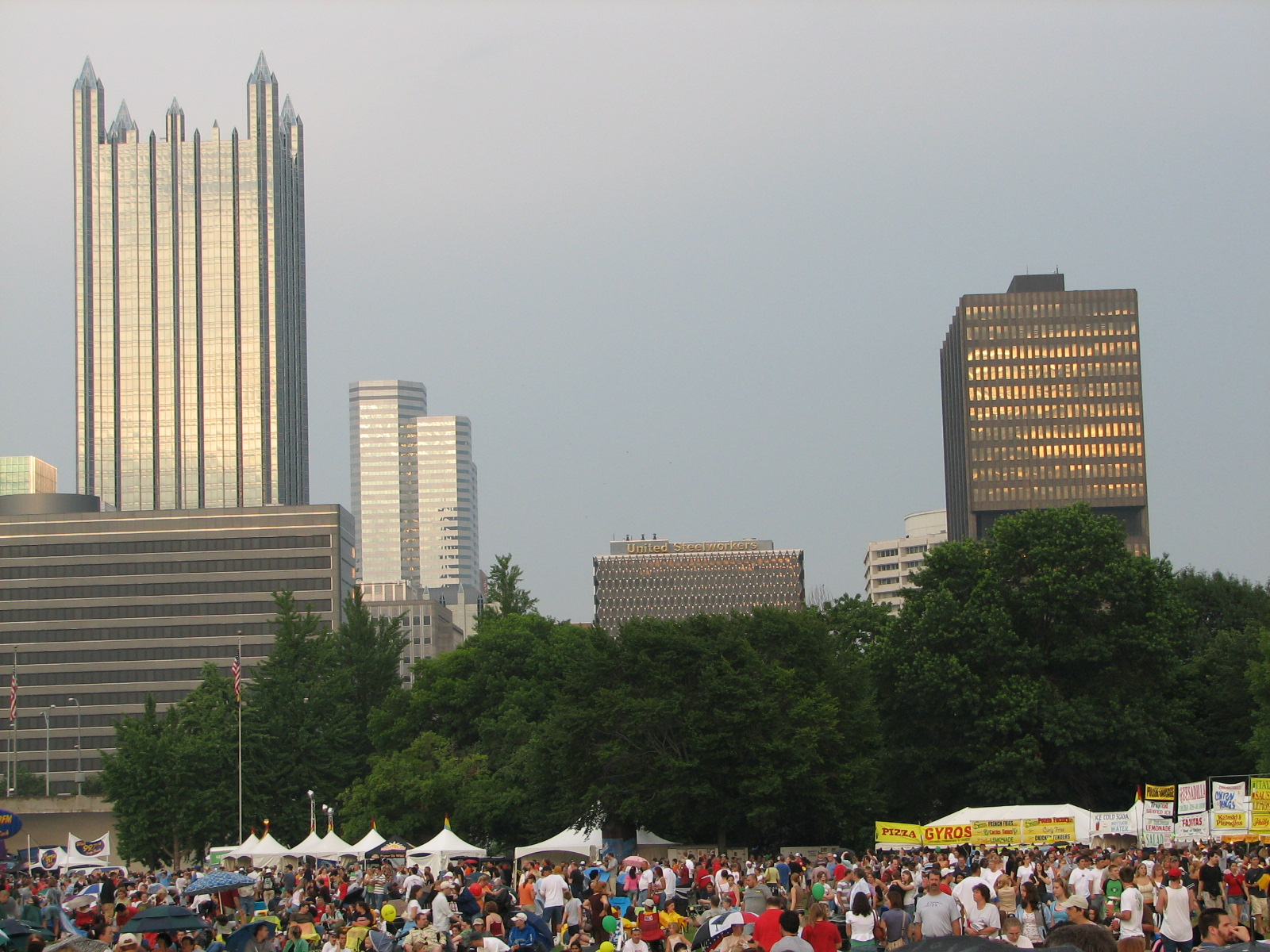
Festival crowd at Point State Park with the downtown Pittsburgh skyline in the background

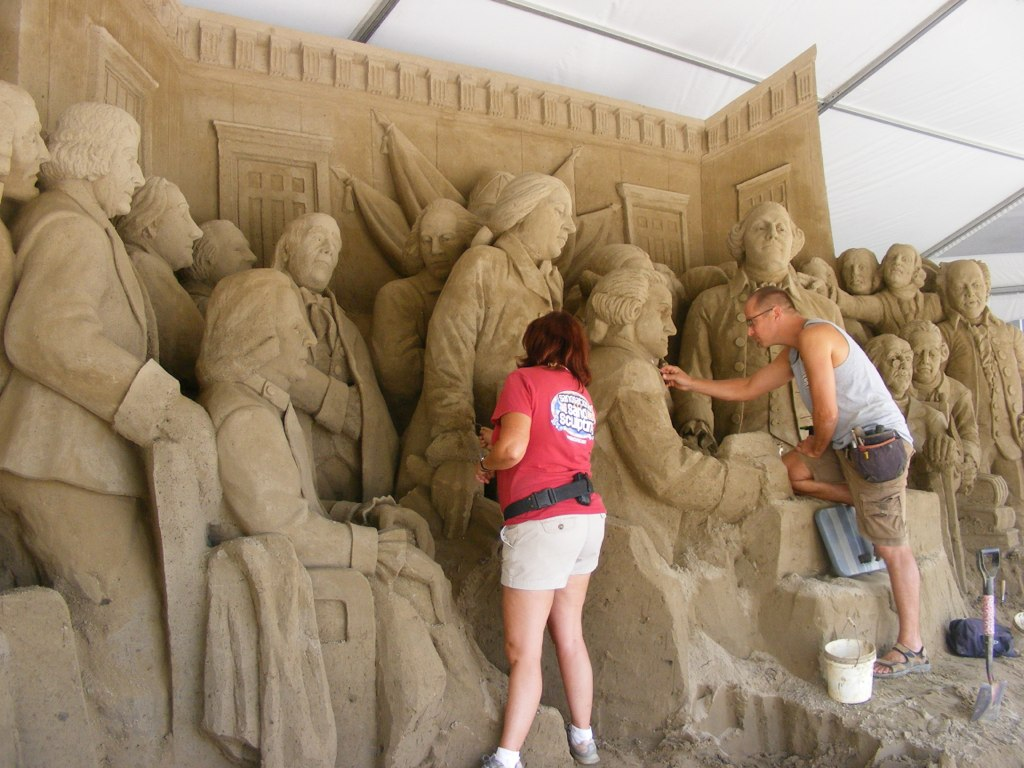
Artists working on an annual sand sculpture for the Regatta

The race corresponds to a three-day festival in downtown Pittsburgh consisting of variety of events including free concerts, food vendors, aerial competitions, various water sports, dragon boat races, and the July Fourth fireworks display for the City of Pittsburgh. Over 1.5 million people are estimated to have attended some aspect of the regatta events every year.

== 1988 Accident ==
On August 7, 1988, one of the Formula 1 boats went out of control and crashed into a crowd near Three Rivers Stadium. A 7-year-old boy was killed, and 24 were injured. The accident was captured on live TV during the broadcast of a Pittsburgh Pirates and New York Mets baseball game from a blimp above the stadium.

== The Kinks ==
On August 7, 1993, The Kinks were playing in the nearby I.C. Light Amphitheater. After contending with noises from the regatta, and particularly a firework set, lead singer Ray Davies improvised a song called "Regatta My Ass".

== Results ==
=== 1979 ===
Held August 11 - 12 and hosted the "Mid-America Sternwheeler Race" with finishing line being the Smithfield Street Bridge.

=== 2008 ===
Place	boat number	pilot	team	hometown	points
1	42	Shaun Torrente	Grand Prix Boats GLBC	Homestead, FL	400
2	16	Tim Seebold	Bud Light Team Seebold	Osage Beach, Missouri	380
3	10	Terry Rinker	Rinker/Amsoil Racing	Tampa, FL	360
4	38	Jeff Shepherd	Shepherd Construction	Woodlawn, TN	350
5	17	Brian Venton	Jenkinson Telecom/Hancock Inc.	Bowmanville, ON	340
6	41	Randy Rinker	Rinker/Amsoil Racing	Syracuse, Indiana	330
7	72	Lynn Simburger	Playcraft Boats	Elsah, Illinois	320
8	88	Billy Joule	B&B / Joule Marine Transport	Tiera Verde, FL	310
9	1	Nithat Kunjeng	Singha Beer	Thailand	300
10	8	Mark Johnson	Pur Sang Engineering	Jaffrey, NH	290
11	6	Matt Sadl	XG-AD.COM/Massageluxe.com	Pacific, MO	280

== Cancellations ==
On July 30, 2019, board members of the Three Rivers Regatta announced that the Regatta, scheduled for August 2 - 4 ,2019, would not be held, citing the failure of the event's promoter to obtain necessary permits and insurance, as well as the money it still owed from earlier Regattas to, among others, the state of Pennsylvania for the use of Point State Park, and both the city of Pittsburgh and the Allegheny County Sheriff's Office for providing security. Bankruptcy hearings for the event's promoter continued into 2020, and the Regatta was also cancelled for 2020 and 2021.
