= Head of the Ohio =

Rowing race in Pittsburgh

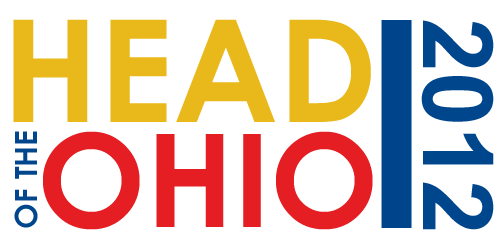
- Frequency: Annual
- Locations: Pittsburgh, Pennsylvania
- Years active: 1987-Present
- Inaugurated: September 26, 1987
- Previous event: October 5-6, 2024
- Next event: TBD
- Participants: 511 entries; 63 clubs
- Organiser: Three Rivers Rowing Association
- Website: www.threeriversrowing.org/hoto

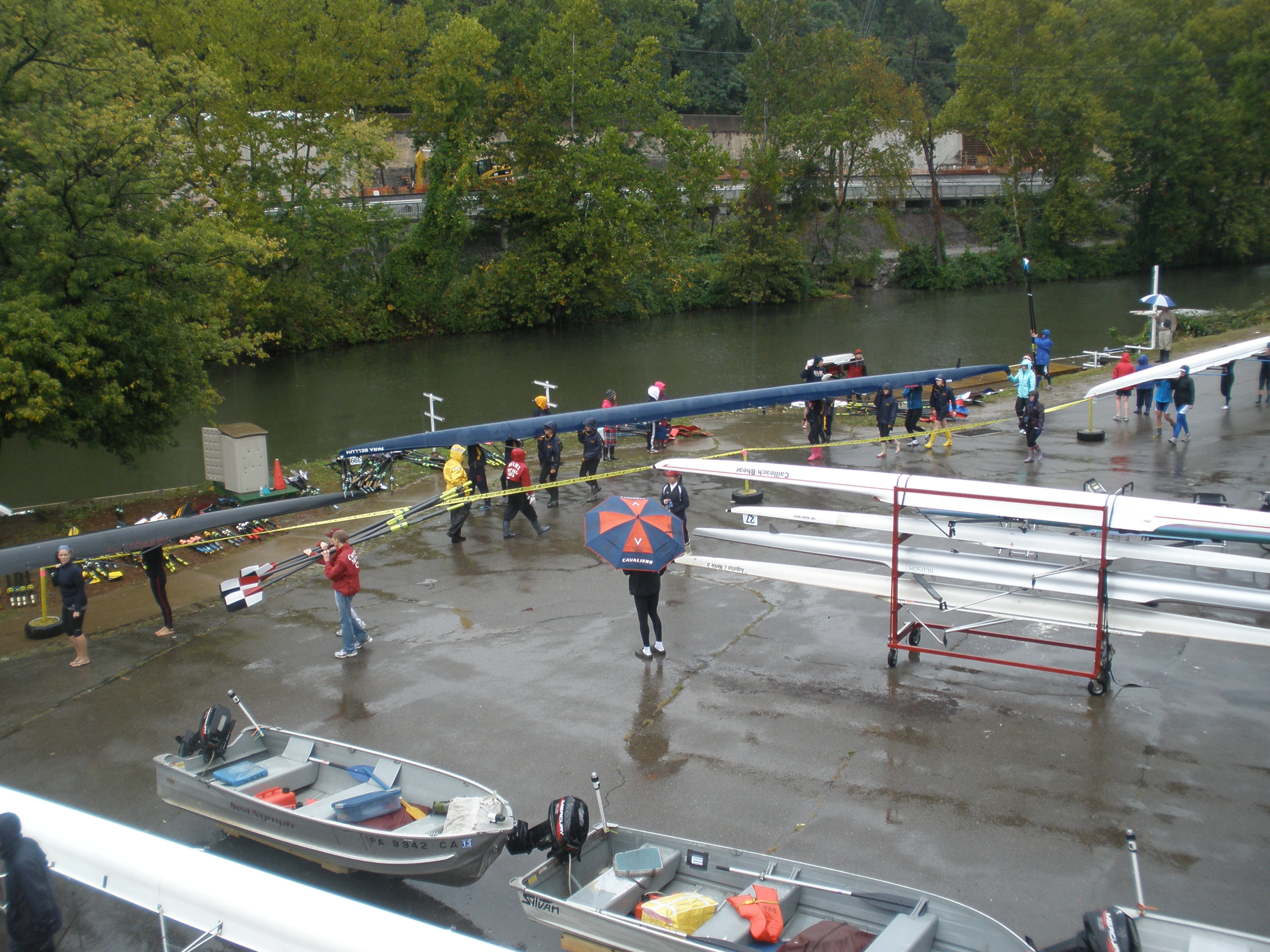
The launch of the Head of the Ohio in 2011.

The Head of the Ohio, also known as HOTO, is a rowing head race held on the first full weekend of October of each year on the Ohio River and Allegheny River, in Pittsburgh, Pennsylvania. It is the largest two-day regatta on the Inland Rivers System, with more than 2,000 athletes rowing from over 75 universities, colleges, and high schools. The regatta was the seventh-largest in both 2006 and 2007.

The last races of the Regatta are generally the most prestigious: Championship 4s, and Championship 8s (both men and women). Championship sculling events (1x/single and 2x/double) race on Saturday afternoon. The Championship events usually include current U.S. National Team athletes.

== Course ==
The 4100 meter course starts beside Herr's Island and finishes just down stream of the Fort Duquesne Bridge.

== History ==
The Head of the Ohio began in 1987 with Mercy Hospital as its major sponsor but since 2006 has been coordinated solely through the Three Rivers Rowing Association. The first race was held during five hours on Saturday September 26, 1987.
