= White Oak Park =

County park in Allegheny County, Pennsylvania

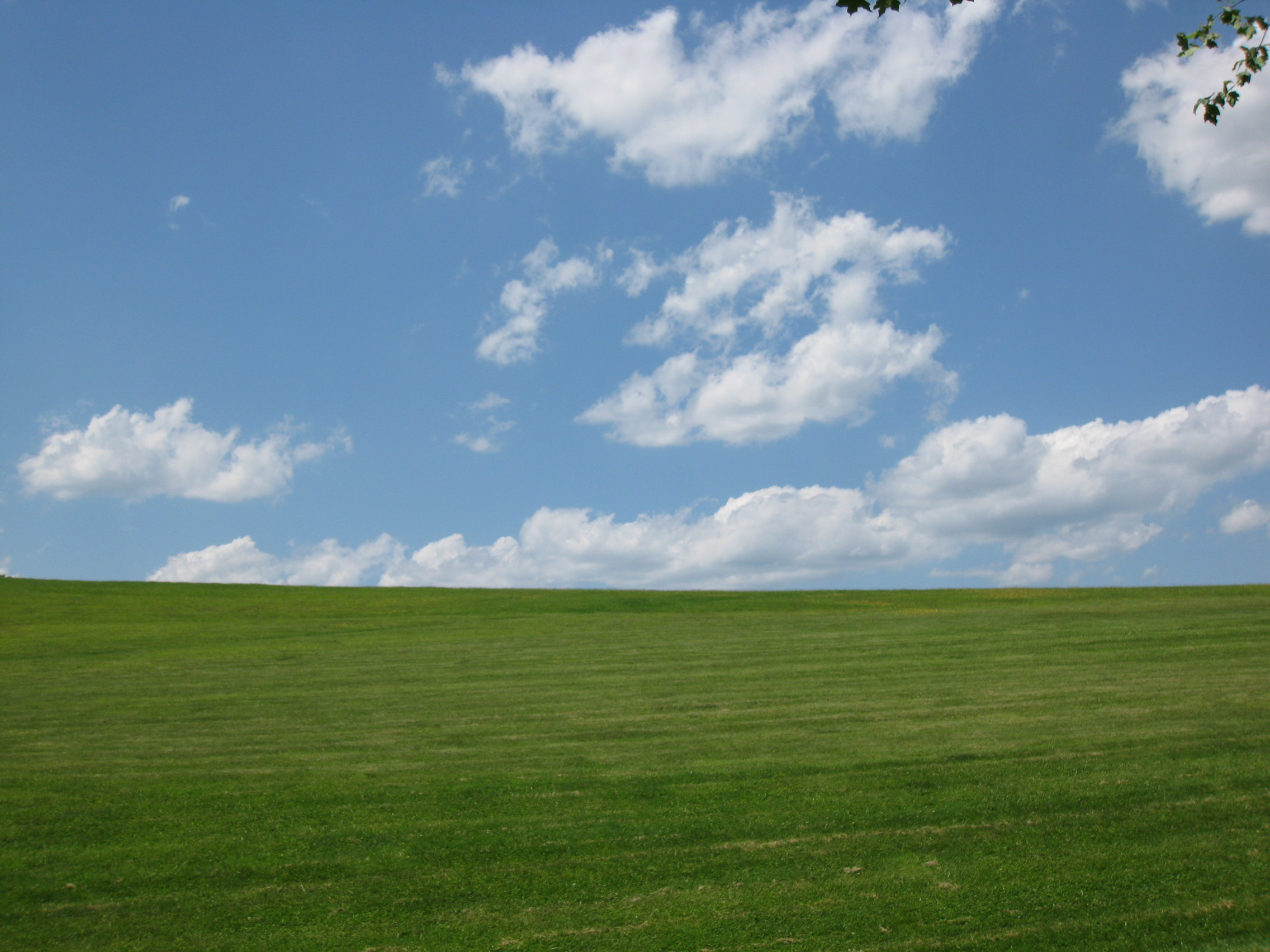
- A view of White Oak Park

- Location within Pennsylvania Location within the United States
- Type: Municipal
- Location: Allegheny County, Pennsylvania
- Coordinates: 40.34088°N 79.78370°W
- Area: 810-acre (3.3 km^{2})

White Oak Park is a 810-acre (3.3 km^{2}) county park in Allegheny County, Pennsylvania, United States. It is a part of the county's 12,000-acre (49 km^{2}) network of nine distinct parks.

It is located 15 miles (24 km) southeast of downtown Pittsburgh in White Oak, Pennsylvania.
