= Al Abrams =

American sportswriter (1904–1977)

Albert Edward Abrams (February 29, 1904 – March 3, 1977) was an American sportswriter who wrote for the Pittsburgh Post-Gazette from 1926 until his death in 1977, serving as its sports editor from April 1947 to March 1974. From 1936, he was founder and president of the Post-Gazette Dapper Dan Club, which, between its inception and Abrams's death, contributed over $800,000 to charitable organizations. In February 1979, the Club instituted the Al Abrams Memorial Award, given to athletes who have already gained admission to their respective sports' Halls of Fame. Abrams died at age 73 in Pittsburgh, Pennsylvania.
