= Sports in Pennsylvania =

Sports in Pennsylvania includes numerous professional sporting teams, events, and venues located in the U.S. state of Pennsylvania.

== Major league professional teams ==
Pennsylvania is home to eight teams from the five major professional sports leagues in the United States and Canada.

Club	League	Division	Venue	Location	Founded	Titles in PA
Philadelphia 76ers	NBA	Atlantic	Xfinity Mobile Arena	Philadelphia	1946	2
Philadelphia Eagles	NFL	NFC East	Lincoln Financial Field	Philadelphia	1933	5
Philadelphia Flyers	NHL	Metropolitan	Xfinity Mobile Arena	Philadelphia	1967	2
Philadelphia Phillies	MLB	NL East	Citizens Bank Park	Philadelphia	1883	2
Philadelphia Union	MLS	Eastern	Subaru Park	Chester	2010	0
Pittsburgh Pirates	MLB	NL Central	PNC Park	Pittsburgh	1881	5
Pittsburgh Penguins	NHL	Metropolitan	PPG Paints Arena	Pittsburgh	1967	5
Pittsburgh Steelers	NFL	AFC North	Acrisure Stadium	Pittsburgh	1933	6

== Major league professional championships ==
=== Philadelphia Eagles (NFL) ===
3 NFL championships (pre-Super Bowl)

- 1948
- 1949
- 1960

2 Super Bowl titles

- 2017 (LII)
- 2024 (LIX)

=== Frankford Yellow Jackets (NFL) ===
1 NFL championship (pre-Super Bowl)

- 1926

=== Pittsburgh Steelers (NFL) ===
6 Super Bowl titles

- 1974 (IX)
- 1975 (X)
- 1978 (XIII)
- 1979 (XIV)
- 2005 (XL)
- 2008 (XLIII)

=== Philadelphia Flyers (NHL) ===
2 Stanley Cup titles

- 1974
- 1975

=== Pittsburgh Penguins (NHL) ===
5 Stanley Cup titles

- 1991
- 1992
- 2009
- 2016
- 2017

=== Philadelphia Athletics (MLB) ===
5 World Series titles

- 1910
- 1911
- 1913
- 1929
- 1930

=== Philadelphia Phillies (MLB) ===
2 World Series titles

- 1980
- 2008

=== Pittsburgh Pirates (MLB) ===
5 World Series titles

- 1909
- 1925
- 1960
- 1971
- 1979

=== Philadelphia Warriors (NBA) ===
2 NBA Finals titles

- 1947
- 1956

=== Philadelphia 76ers (NBA) ===
2 NBA Finals titles

- 1967
- 1983

=== Pittsburgh Pipers (ABA) ===
1 ABA Finals title

- 1968

=== Philadelphia Atoms (NASL) ===
1 Soccer Bowl / NASL Final title

- 1973

== Football ==
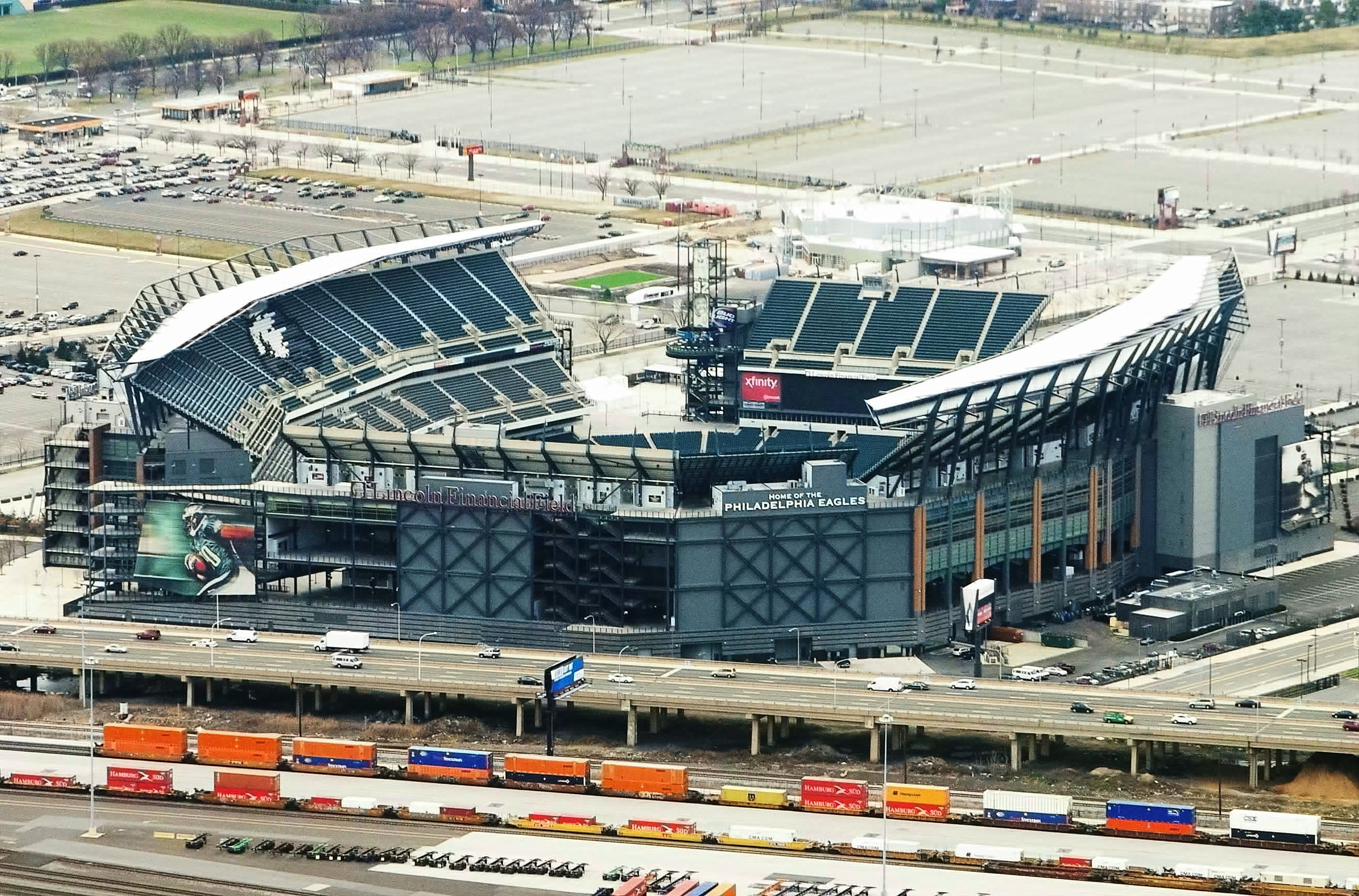
Lincoln Financial Field in South Philadelphia has been the home field of the Philadelphia Eagles since 2003

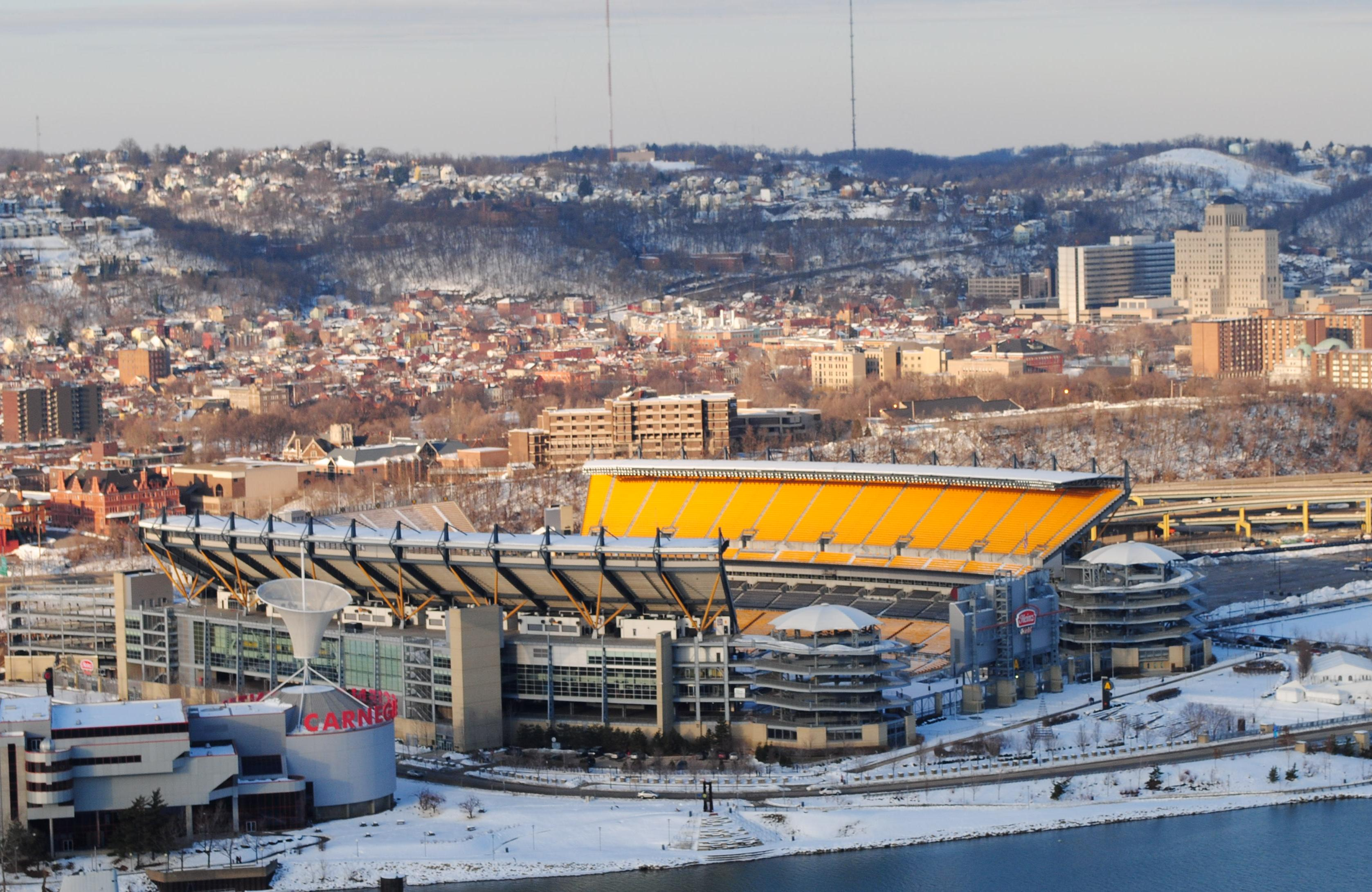
Acrisure Stadium in the North Shore neighborhood of Pittsburgh, home field of the Pittsburgh Steelers since 2001

Football is the most popular sport in Pennsylvania, especially in the Lehigh Valley, Northeastern Pennsylvania, Central Pennsylvania, and Western Pennsylvania. Western Pennsylvania in particular was home to some of the earliest moments in football history, and the earliest professional clubs played in the Western Pennsylvania Professional Football Circuit. Pudge Heffelfinger was the first known professional football player, while John Brallier was the first openly professional player. The Allegheny Athletic Association fielded the first entirely openly professional team in 1896. In 1902, three Pennsylvania teams founded the National Football League (which has no ties to today's NFL), the first attempt at a national professional football league. Jim Thorpe, a multi-sport athlete who played in the NFL and won Olympic gold medals in the pentathlon and decathlon, attended Carlisle Indian Industrial School in Carlisle, Pennsylvania. Jim Thorpe, Pennsylvania is named after him.

Today, football is popular on all levels, from high school, college, and professionally. The high school games get regular attention in the local newspapers and games regularly draw over 10,000 fans. Pennsylvania produces several college and professional players every year, and Western Pennsylvania is noted for being the home of numerous quarterbacks, including Dan Marino, Joe Montana, and Johnny Unitas.

Professionally, the Pittsburgh Steelers and Philadelphia Eagles of the NFL are also hugely popular. Both franchises entered the NFL in 1933, and the two franchises briefly merged during World War II. Both teams have fan bases across the entire state. Often one of the rowdiest in the NFL, the Eagles fanbase is known for their passion and dedication. In fact, the Eagles' old home field, Veterans Stadium, was the first sports stadium in the United States to have a jail cell as a result of the rowdiness of the fans, but was removed only a couple years later after incidents settled down. Both fanbases though are considered to be among the best traveled fanbases in the NFL. During games in which the teams are on the road, Steelers fans and Eagles fans alike migrate to the opposing team's stadium and always have a strong presence, and in some cases, their numbers have made opposing teams feel as if they are not in their home stadium—a testament to the die-hard fanbases of professional football in Pennsylvania.

Pennsylvania has also been home to two defunct NFL franchises, both of which played in the 1920s. The Pottsville Maroons played in Pottsville, Pennsylvania; the franchise is notable for its part in the 1925 NFL Championship controversy. Frankford (a neighborhood in Philadelphia) also briefly had its own team in the 1920s, known as the Frankford Yellow Jackets. The team won the 1926 NFL Championship, but disbanded during the Great Depression. A third NFL franchise, the Dallas Texans, was briefly headquartered in Hershey, Pennsylvania during the 1952 season. Pennsylvania also had teams in four national leagues that competed with the NFL: the 1920s AFL, the 1930s AFL, the World Football League, and the USFL.

Philadelphia was also home to an Arena Football League team, the Philadelphia Soul who played in the league from 2004 to 2019. Pittsburgh was also the home to one of the founding Arena Football League franchises, the Pittsburgh Gladiators. After four seasons in Pittsburgh, the team moved to Tampa, Florida, in 1991 and became the Tampa Bay Storm. Pittsburgh got another AFL team in 2011, the Pittsburgh Power, which folded in 2014. The Wilkes-Barre/Scranton Pioneers played in the AFL's minor league af2 until that league disbanded in 2009.

In addition to NFL and arena football teams, Pennsylvania is also home to minor professional teams from numerous other leagues. Men's teams include the Chambersburg Cardinals and the Pittsburgh Colts. There are also several women's football teams, including the Keystone Assault, Pittsburgh Passion, and Philadelphia Firebirds.

The Harrisburg Stampede played in the National Arena League before folding, and arena football returns with the Wilkes-Barre/Scranton Mavericks set to play in Arena Football One.

== Baseball ==
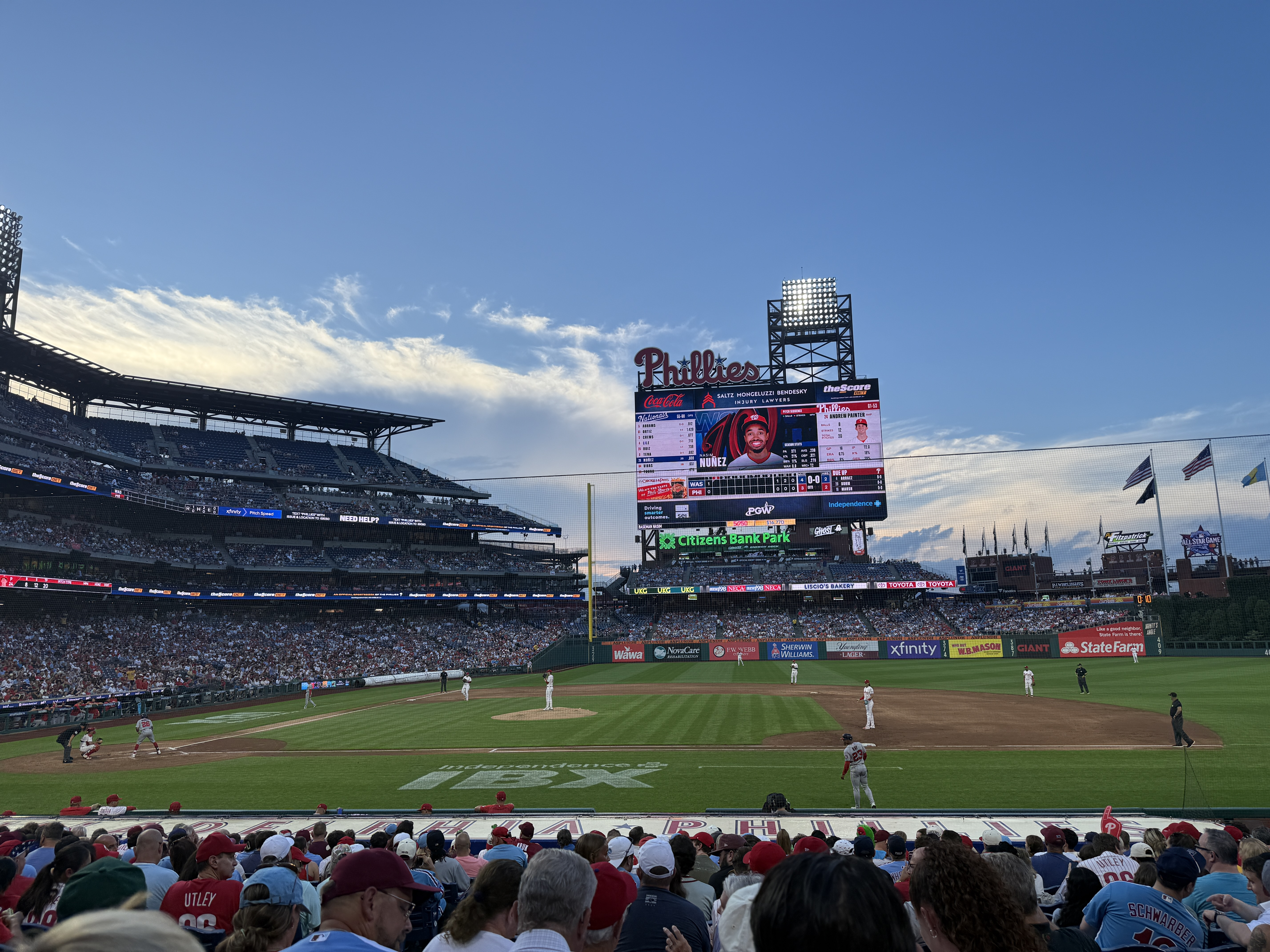
The Philadelphia Phillies playing the Washington Nationals at Citizens Bank Park in South Philadelphia in August 2026

Baseball is one of the more popular sports in Pennsylvania. The state has both major league and minor league baseball teams. The two major league baseball teams in Pennsylvania are the Philadelphia Phillies and the Pittsburgh Pirates. The Phillies and the Pirates are two of the eight National League franchises that originated in the nineteenth century. As such, the Phillies and the Pirates have had a rivalry for over one hundred years. The rivalry was particularly strong during the 1970s and 1980s, when the two teams frequently competed to win the National League East. The rivalry has cooled off since the Pirates moved to the NL Central in 1994, but the two teams continue to play each other every year. Although the Pirates have won more World Series (five in total), the Phillies won the World Series more recently (in 2008). Both teams have had stretches of success and futility. Pennsylvania is the only state with two teams that are in the same league (National League) but in separate divisions (Pittsburgh in the NL Central and Philadelphia in the NL East).

Philadelphia and Pittsburgh were also the home of numerous defunct and relocated major league franchises, including the American League's Philadelphia Athletics, which moved to Kansas City, Missouri, in the 1950s. The franchise now plays in Oakland, California, as the Oakland Athletics. Pittsburgh briefly hosted a second major league team in the 20th century: the Pittsburgh Rebels played in the Federal League during the fledgling league's two seasons of existence. Altoona also had a short-lived team in the 19th century Union Association. Prior to the integration of Major League Baseball that occurred after World War II, both Philadelphia and Pittsburgh had negro league baseball teams.

Pennsylvania is the original home of Little League Baseball. In 1939, Carl Stotz (1910-1992), founded Little League Baseball in Williamsport, Pennsylvania, and the organization was incorporated in 1950. The Little League World Series is still held for youth teams from the United States and foreign nations in a tournament every year in South Williamsport.

=== Minor league baseball ===
As of 2021, Pennsylvania has nine minor league baseball teams. Six of these teams are affiliates of major league teams, while the remaining teams are independent. Pennsylvania has also been home to minor leagues and minor league teams that are now defunct, such as the Pennsylvania State Association and the Allentown Peanuts. Pennsylvania is also home to two teams in the new MLB Draft League, the State College Spikes and the Williamsport Crosscutters, as well as a collegiate summer baseball in Johnstown, the Johnstown Mill Rats.

Geographic name	Team	Stadium	Est. (Note: This category indicates the year the franchise started playing in its current city)	Level	League	Affiliation
Lehigh Valley	IronPigs	Coca-Cola Park	2008	Triple-A	International League	Philadelphia Phillies
Scranton/Wilkes-Barre	Highlanders	PNC Field	1989	Triple-A	International League	New York Yankees
Altoona	Curve	Peoples Natural Gas Field	1999	Double-A	Eastern League	Pittsburgh Pirates
Erie	SeaWolves	UPMC Park	1995	Double-A	Eastern League	Detroit Tigers
Harrisburg	Senators	FNB Field	1987	Double-A	Eastern League	Washington Nationals
Reading	Fightin Phils	FirstEnergy Stadium	1967	Double-A	Eastern League	Philadelphia Phillies
Lancaster	Stormers	Penn Medicine Park	2003	N/A	Atlantic League	Independent
York	Revolution	WellSpan Park	2006	N/A	Atlantic League	Independent
Washington	Wild Things	EQT Park	1997	N/A	Frontier League	Independent

== Basketball ==
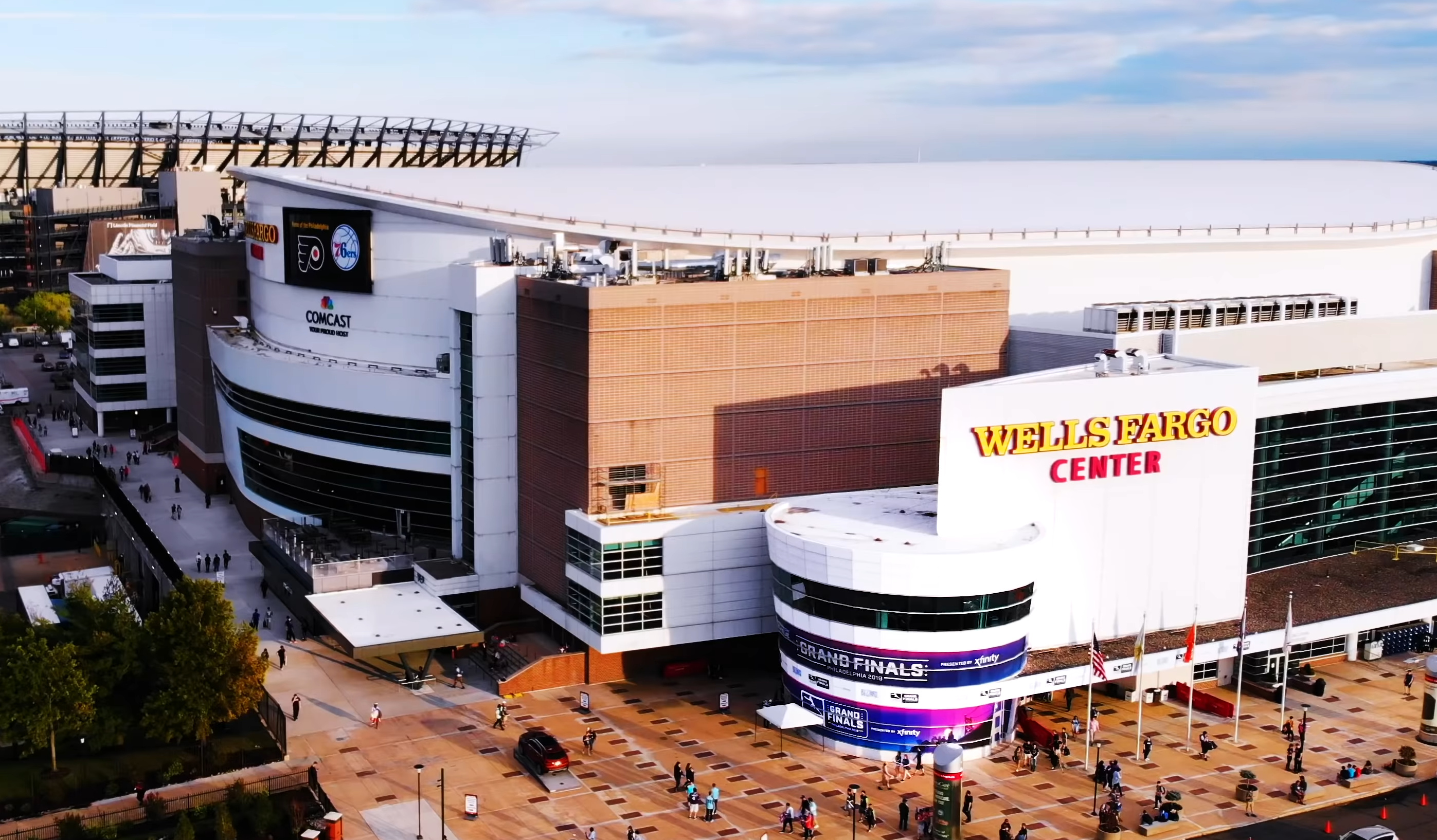
Xfinity Mobile Arena in South Philadelphia, home court of the Philadelphia 76ers of the NBA and the home arena of the Philadelphia Flyers of the NHL

Unlike the other major professional sports leagues, the National Basketball Association only has one team in Pennsylvania. The Philadelphia 76ers, which relocated from Syracuse, New York, in 1963, have won three NBA championships and, as of 2018, the franchise has won the fifth most championship games in NBA history (tied with the Detroit Pistons and Miami Heat). Philadelphia also hosted another NBA team from 1946 to 1962, the Philadelphia Warriors, but the franchise moved to San Francisco and later became what is now known as the Golden State Warriors.

Pittsburgh briefly had a team in the Basketball Association of America known as the Pittsburgh Ironmen, and an American Basketball Association franchise called the Pittsburgh Condors, but no NBA franchise has ever called Pittsburgh home.

In addition to the 76ers, Pennsylvania also has a few other professional basketball teams. The Erie BayHawks are an NBA G League team affiliated with the NBA's New Orleans Pelicans. This team will play in Erie until moving to its intended permanent home of Birmingham, Alabama, in 2022. The Steel City Yellow Jackets play in the ABA. The Harrisburg Horizon are a member of the Eastern Basketball Alliance, while the Harrisburg Lady Horizon are a member of the Women's Eastern Basketball Alliance.

Pennsylvania has never had a team in the Women's National Basketball Association, the top women's basketball league in the United States, though a new team in Philadelphia was announced in June 2025 with an opening season in 2030.

The Philadelphia area has produced NBA players such as Wilt Chamberlain, Kobe Bryant, and Paul Arizin, while Pete Maravich was from Aliquippa.

== Ice hockey ==
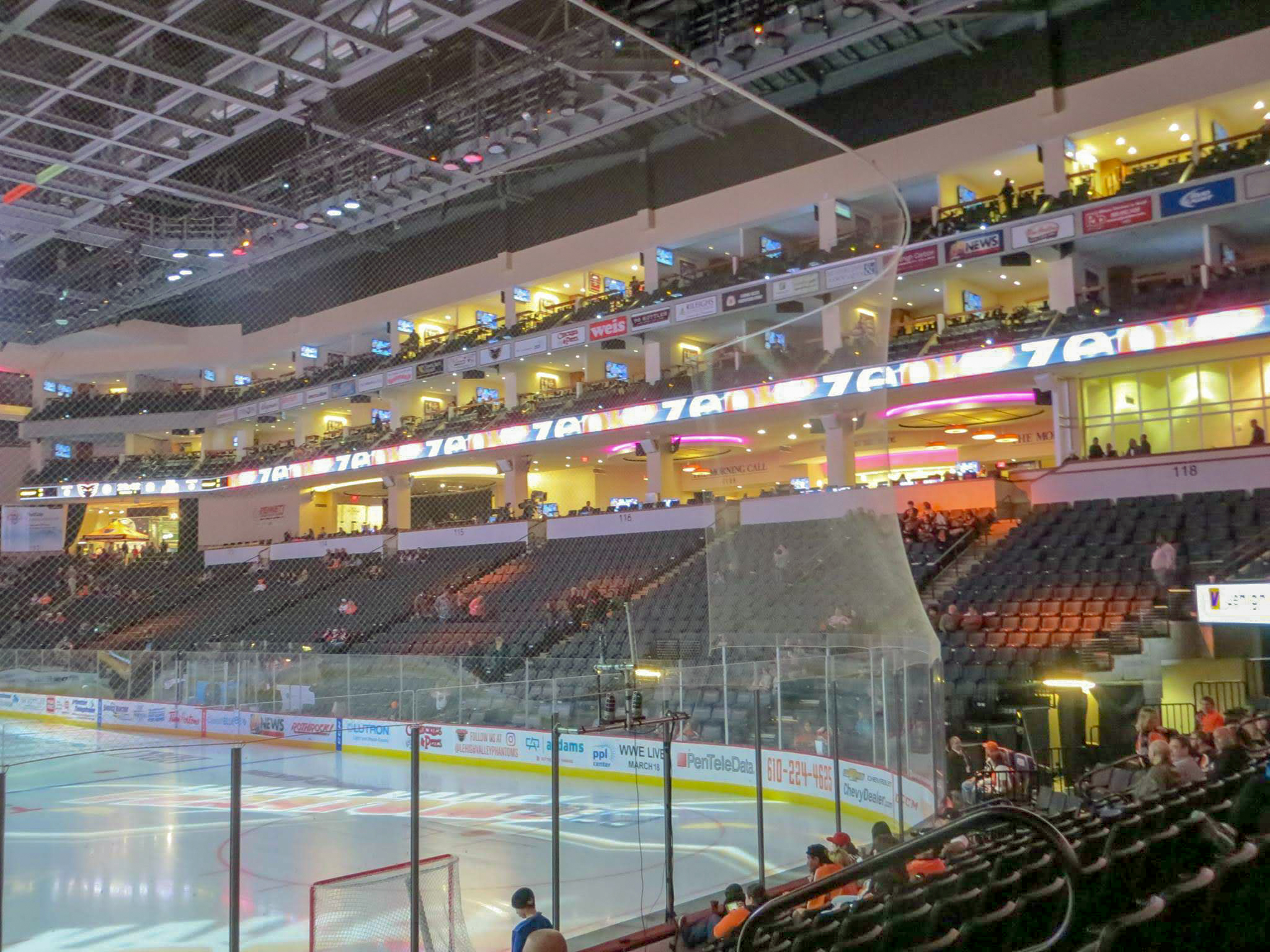
PPL Center in Allentown home to the Lehigh Valley Phantoms of the American Hockey League, the primary development hockey team of the Philadelphia Flyers

Due in large part to Pennsylvania's cold winter climate and the state's geographic location in the Northeast, hockey is fairly popular throughout Pennsylvania. In all, seven professional hockey teams call Pennsylvania home, including two NHL teams.

Perhaps the strongest current in-state professional sports rivalry is between the Philadelphia Flyers and the Pittsburgh Penguins, both of which play in the Metropolitan Division of the NHL. With the exception of a seven-year period in the 1970s, the two teams have been divisional rivals since they joined the NHL in the 1967 expansion. The rivalry is generally considered to be one of the fiercest in the NHL. The two franchises have been among the most successful teams since they joined the league, as the Flyers have the most Stanley Cup Final appearances among the non-Original Six teams, while the Penguins are tied for the third most Stanley Cup wins among non-Original Six teams.

The Hershey Bears are renowned for being the oldest existing AHL franchise, and the oldest existing hockey franchise outside of the NHL's Original Six. The Lehigh Valley Phantoms, also of the AHL, are the primary development team of the Philadelphia Flyers and play their home games at PPL Center in Allentown.

Pennsylvania is notable for being one of the few states with a team in the Canadian Hockey League, and the state was also home to the Western Pennsylvania Hockey League, one of the first professional hockey leagues. In addition to the two current NHL teams that joined the league in the 1960s, Pennsylvania also had an NHL franchise in the 1920s: a hockey team named the Pirates played in the NHL for five seasons before moving to Philadelphia and becoming the Philadelphia Quakers. The franchise disbanded after its only season in Philadelphia. Philadelphia also briefly had a WHA franchise.

A number of notable current and former professional hockey players are Pennsylvania natives: Mike Richter, one of the most successful American-born goaltenders in NHL history; Pete Babando; Bob Beers; Jay Caufield; Ryan Malone; Gerry O'Flaherty; George Parros; Jesse Spring; and R.J. Umberger. Legendary amateur hockey player Hobey Baker, namesake of U.S. college hockey's Hobey Baker Memorial Award, was also born in Pennsylvania.

=== Minor league & major junior hockey ===
Geographic name	Team	Stadium	Est.	League	Affiliation (Note: As of 2016)
Hershey	Bears	Giant Center	1932	AHL	Washington Capitals
Lehigh Valley	Phantoms	PPL Center	2014	AHL	Philadelphia Flyers
Wilkes-Barre/Scranton	Penguins	Mohegan Arena at Casey Plaza	1999	AHL	Pittsburgh Penguins
Reading	Royals	Santander Arena	1991	ECHL	Philadelphia Flyers
Erie	Otters	Erie Insurance Arena	1996	OHL	
Johnstown	Tomahawks	1st Summit Bank Arena	1990	NAHL	

== Soccer ==
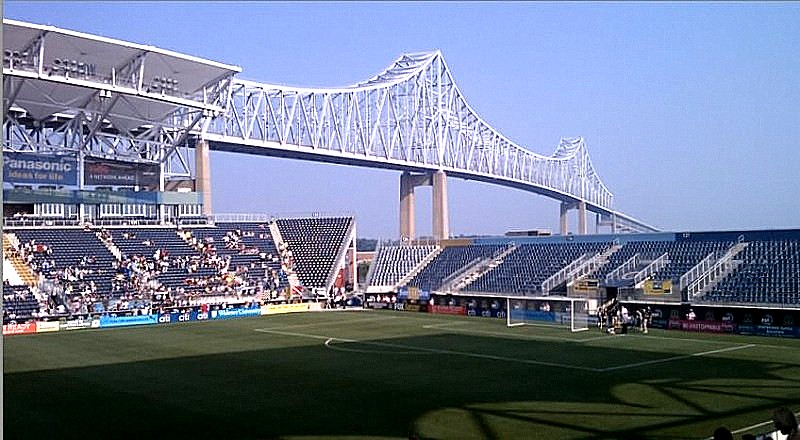
Subaru Park in Chester, home field of the Philadelphia Union, Philadelphia's Major League Soccer team

Pennsylvania has three active professional outdoor soccer teams. Since 2010, Chester, Pennsylvania has been home to the Philadelphia Union of Major League Soccer, the top league in the US Soccer Pyramid. Additionally, Pennsylvania has one team in the second-tier USL Championship (previously the United Soccer League), the Pittsburgh Riverhounds SC, as well as a third-tier team in MLS Next Pro: Philadelphia Union II. The state had a third team in the USL Championship, the Harrisburg-based Penn FC, but that team suspended professional operations for the 2019 season and ultimately folded. Pennsylvania also has several indoor soccer and amateur teams, including the Harrisburgh Heat of the Major Arena Soccer League, Reading United A.C. and the Pittsburgh Riverhounds U23 of USL League Two (formerly the Premier Development League), and numerous teams in the National Premier Soccer League. Pennsylvania also women's teams, including the Lancaster Inferno of the Women's Premier Soccer League. As of 2020, Pennsylvania does not have a team in the top-level women's league, the National Women's Soccer League.

Pennsylvania has a long history with soccer. The first professional American soccer league, the American League of Professional Football, included a team named the "Philadelphia Phillies" (all of the teams were affiliated with National League baseball teams). The original Bethlehem Steel won championships in the National Association Football League and the American Soccer League. Despite disbanding in the 1930s, the club still shares the record (with Maccabi Los Angeles) for most U.S. Open Cup wins, with five. The North American Soccer League, which was perhaps the most prominent American soccer league until the formation of Major League Soccer, had two teams in Pennsylvania: the Philadelphia Atoms and the Philadelphia Fury.

Pennsylvania-based clubs have captured the U.S. Open Cup a total of 14 times, the third-most among states, and Pennsylvania teams have won the National Amateur Cup several times. Pennsylvania has also been home to numerous soccer players, including Walter Bahr, the captain of the U.S. national team at the 1950 FIFA World Cup.

=== Minor league soccer ===
Geographic name	Team	Stadium	Est.	League	
Pittsburgh	Riverhounds SC	F.N.B. Stadium	1998	USLC	Independent
Philadelphia	Union II	Subaru Park	2015	MLSNP	Philadelphia Union
Lehigh Valley	United	Rocco Calvo Field	2009	USL 2	Independent
Reading	United AC	Alvernia Turf Field	1996	USL 2	Philadelphia Union
Philadelphia	Lone Star FC	South Philadelphia Athletic Super Site	2001	USL 2	Independent
Electric City	Shock SC	Fitzpatrick Field	2013	NPSL	Independent
Erie	Commodores FC	Saxon Stadium	2009	NPSL / UWS	Independent
Hershey	Hershey FC	Hershey High School	2013	NPSL	Independent
Pennsylvania	Classics AC	Spooky Nook Sports Lancaster	2015	NPSL	Independent
Lancaster	Inferno FC	Pucillo Field	2008	USL W League	Independent
Erie	Erie FC	Gus Anderson Field	2023	WPSL	Independent
Steel City	Steel City FC	Founders Field	2018	USL 2 / USL W	Independent
Pittsburgh	Riveters SC	F.N.B. Stadium	2024	USL W League	Independent

== College teams ==
There are 15 NCAA Division I schools spread across Pennsylvania. In addition to the Division I schools listed below, there are also several other college athletic programs in Pennsylvania.

School	Team	Est.	Type	Location	Varsity sports	Conference (Note: Note that some schools play in multiple conferences, especially for football. The conference listed is the primary conference that the school competes in.)	Football
Bucknell University	Bison	1846	Private	Lewisburg	25	Patriot League	FCS
Drexel University	Dragons	1878	Private	Philadelphia	18	CAA	No
Duquesne University	Dukes	1891	Catholic	Pittsburgh	16	Atlantic 10	FCS
Lafayette College	Leopards	1826	Private	Easton	23	Patriot League	FCS
La Salle University	Explorers	1863	Catholic	Philadelphia	20	Atlantic 10	No
Lehigh University	Mountain Hawks	1865	Private	Bethlehem	23	Patriot League	FCS
Mercyhurst University	Lakers	1926	Private	Erie	27	Northeast Conference	FCS
University of Pennsylvania	Quakers	1740	Private	Philadelphia	27	Ivy League	FCS
Pennsylvania State University	Nittany Lions	1855	Public	University Park	29	Big Ten	FBS
University of Pittsburgh	Panthers	1787	Public	Pittsburgh	19	ACC	FBS
Robert Morris University	Colonials	1921	Private	Moon Township	16	Horizon League	FCS
Saint Francis University	Red Wolves	1847	Catholic	Loretto	22	Northeast Conference	FCS
Saint Joseph's University	Hawks	1851	Catholic	Philadelphia	20	Atlantic 10	No
Temple University	Owls	1884	Public	Philadelphia	19	The American	FBS
Villanova University	Wildcats	1842	Catholic	Villanova	24	Big East	FCS

Pennsylvania is home to several prominent collegiate rivalries. The Penn State–Pittsburgh football rivalry began in the 19th century, and was once considered one of the most important rivalries north of the Mason–Dixon line. Although the two schools have not played as frequently since Penn State and Pittsburgh joined football conferences in the 1990s, the rivalry between the two schools continues to divide the state. Before the 2023–24 season, when a sixth school was officially added to the rivalry, the Philadelphia Big 5 played a basketball round robin every year to determine the top basketball school in the Philadelphia area. The round-robin series has been replaced by a mini-tournament in which each team plays three games. Pittsburgh is also home to a heated basketball rivalry, as Duquesne and Pittsburgh play each other every year in the City Game. The Lehigh Valley is home to a heated college football rivalry so deeply ingrained into both schools' traditions that the annual game is simply known as "The Rivalry."

Since the NCAA tournament began in 1939, Pennsylvania has produced four Division I basketball champions: La Salle won the championship in 1954, while Villanova won the championship in 1985, 2016, and 2018. In football, four different Pennsylvania schools claim Division I FBS championships. Pittsburgh claims nine national titles, Penn claims seven titles, Penn State claims two titles, and Lafayette claims one title. Since the division's formation in 1978, Villanova's 2009 championship is the lone FCS championship won by a Pennsylvania school. Lehigh also has one appearance in the championship game.

== List of championships ==
The following is a list of championships won by Pennsylvania teams in NCAA Division I FBS football, NCAA Division I men's basketball, and the five major leagues (MLB, NHL, NFL, NBA, NASL/MLS). For football, the list includes Division I (formerly known as the "University Division" and "Division I-A") champions prior to the 1978 split of Division I into two subdivisions (FBS and FCS), and college football champions prior to the 1956 split of the NCAA into divisions. For basketball, the list only includes the winners of the NCAA Division I men's basketball tournament, which began in 1939.

=== College football ===
- 1895 Penn Quakers
- 1896 Lafayette Leopards
- 1897 Penn Quakers
- 1904 Penn Quakers
- 1908 Penn Quakers
- 1918 Pittsburgh Panthers
- 1910 Pittsburgh Panthers
- 1911 Penn State Nittany Lions
- 1912 Penn State Nittany Lions
- 1916 Pittsburgh Panthers
- 1937 Pittsburgh Panthers

=== NCAA Division I football ===
- 1976 Pittsburgh Panthers
- 1982 Penn State Nittany Lions
- 1986 Penn State Nittany Lions

=== National Football League ===
- 1926 Frankford Yellow Jackets
- 1948 Philadelphia Eagles
- 1949 Philadelphia Eagles
- 1960 Philadelphia Eagles

=== Super Bowl ===
- 1974 Pittsburgh Steelers
- 1975 Pittsburgh Steelers
- 1978 Pittsburgh Steelers
- 1979 Pittsburgh Steelers
- 2005 Pittsburgh Steelers
- 2008 Pittsburgh Steelers
- 2017 Philadelphia Eagles
- 2024 Philadelphia Eagles

=== World Series ===
- 1909 Pittsburgh Pirates
- 1910 Philadelphia Athletics
- 1911 Philadelphia Athletics
- 1913 Philadelphia Athletics
- 1925 Pittsburgh Pirates
- 1929 Philadelphia Athletics
- 1930 Philadelphia Athletics
- 1960 Pittsburgh Pirates
- 1971 Pittsburgh Pirates
- 1979 Pittsburgh Pirates
- 1980 Philadelphia Phillies
- 2008 Philadelphia Phillies

=== Basketball ===
- 1946-47 Philadelphia Warriors (Note: The Warriors won the 1947 BAA Finals. The NBA traces its lineage through its predecessor, the BAA, which was founded in 1946. The BAA merged with the NBL to form the NBA 1949.)
- 1953–54 La Salle Explorers
- 1955-56 Philadelphia Warriors
- 1966-67 Philadelphia 76ers
- 1982-83 Philadelphia 76ers
- 1984–85 Villanova Wildcats
- 2015–16 Villanova Wildcats
- 2017–18 Villanova Wildcats

=== North American Soccer League ===
- 1973 Philadelphia Atoms

=== Stanley Cup ===
- 1973-74 Philadelphia Flyers
- 1974-75 Philadelphia Flyers
- 1990–91 Pittsburgh Penguins
- 1991–92 Pittsburgh Penguins
- 2008–09 Pittsburgh Penguins
- 2015–16 Pittsburgh Penguins
- 2016–17 Pittsburgh Penguins

== Lacrosse ==
Lacrosse in Pennsylvania has a long history. Lehigh, Swarthmore, and Penn were early members of the United States Intercollegiate Lacrosse Association, and lacrosse is now played at many Pennsylvania colleges. Pennsylvania has had professional lacrosse teams such as the Philadelphia Wings and the Pittsburgh Bulls.

== Olympians ==
- Giddeon Massie of Quakertown, member, 2004 Bicycling team
- John Woodruff of Connellsville, gold medal, 1936, in 800-meters event
- Catherine "Kit" Klein of Harrisburg, gold and bronze, 1932 Olympics, 1936 Olympics, speed skater, World Record – 1000 meters (1935), World Record – 3000 meters (1936), 1936 World Champion
- Roger Kingdom of Monroeville, gold medal in both 1984 and 1988 Olympics, 110m hurdles
- Kurt Angle, 1996 freestyle wrestling gold medalist
- Kim Gallagher, American track & field Olympian in the 800 meters in 1984 and 1988. She also holds National High School Records and PIAA state records and was a Penn Relays champion
- Lauryn Williams 2004, silver medal winner, women's 100m track, native of Rochester, Pennsylvania
- Marty Nothstein of Trexlertown, gold medal, 2000, Cycling
- Angie Loy of Elliottsburg, eighth place, 2008, Field Hockey
- Michael Shine of Youngsville, Pennsylvania, silver medal, 400m hurdles at the 1976 Summer Olympics

== Bicycle racing ==
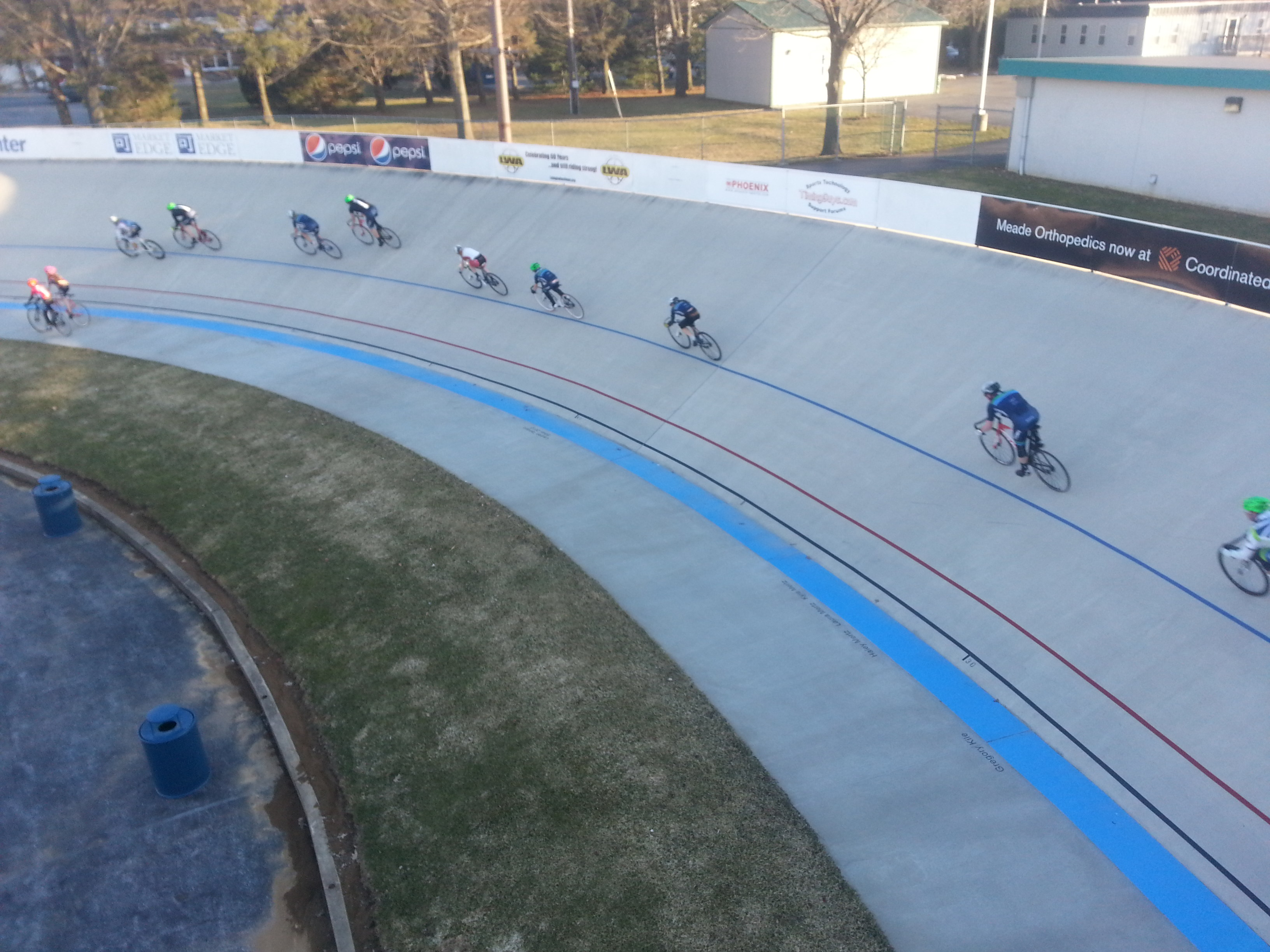
Valley Preferred Cycling Center in Breinigsville, a velodrome for professional cycling

Pennsylvania hosts the Pro Cycling Tour "Triple Crown of Cycling" bicycle races each June, with the Tom Bamford Lancaster Classic, the Reading Classic, and the Philadelphia International Championship. The PCT is sanctioned by USA Cycling, the national governing body for cycling in the United States. Pennsylvania also hosts the Univest Grand Prix professional bicycle race each year in September, sanctioned by the Union Cycliste Internationale, the worldwide governing body for cycling. The road race starts and finishes in Souderton, while the criterium is located in Doylestown. The Valley Preferred Cycling Center annually hosts a USA Cycling Elite Nationals qualifying event.

Floyd Landis, of Farmersville was stripped of his 2006 Tour de France title due to prohibited doping.

== Motorsports ==
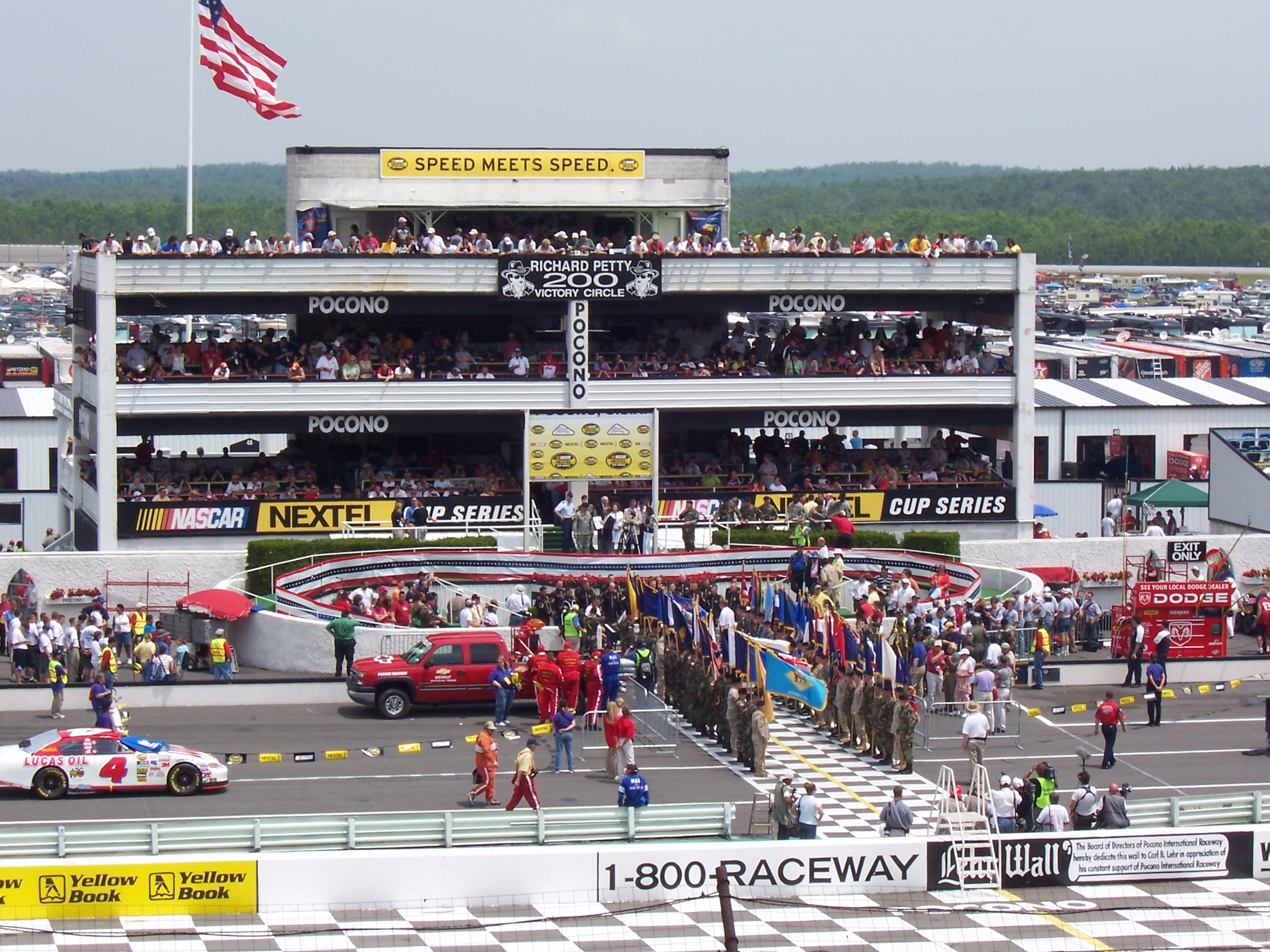
NASCAR racing at Pocono Raceway in Long Pond

The Mario Andretti dynasty of race drivers hails from Nazareth, Pennsylvania. Pocono Raceway in Long Pond is home to one NASCAR race weekend a year, the HighPoint.com 400 in July. The track formerly had an IndyCar race weekend, the Pocono 500, and a second NASCAR race weekend, the Pocono 325. Pennsylvania has also seen success in the sport of drag racing in the form of five time NHRA Top Fuel champion Joe Amato

=== Dirt track racing ===
Dirt ovals include Dunn Hill 2 Speedway in Monroeton, Allegheny Mountain Raceway in Kane, Bedford Speedway in Bedford, Big Diamond Raceway in Minersville, Blanket Hill Speedway in Kittanning, Borger's Speedway in Saylorsburg, Bradford Speedway in Bradford, Challenger Raceway in Indiana, Clinton County Raceway in Lock Haven, Clyde Martin Memorial Speedway in Schaefferstown, Dog Hollow Speedway in Strongstown, Eriez Speedway in Erie, Farmington VFD Speedway in Farmington, Gamblers Raceway Park in Clearfield, Grandview Speedway in Bechtelsville, Greenwood Valley Action Track in Millville, Hamlin Speedway in Hamlin, Hesston Speedway in Huntingdon, Hill Valley Speedway in Orbisonia, Hummingbird Speedway in Falls Creek, Lake Moc-A-Tek Speedway in Lakeville, Latrobe Speedway in Latrobe, Lernerville Speedway in Sarver, Lincoln Speedway in Abbottstown, Linda's Speedway in Jonestown (Lebanon County), Marion Center Speedway in Marion Center, McKean County Raceway in East Smethport, Mercer Raceway Park in Mercer, Path Valley Speedway Park in Spring Run, Penn Can Speedway in Susquehanna, Pittsburgh's Pa Motor Speedway in Imperial, Port Royal Speedway in Port Royal, Redline Raceway in Troy, Roaring Knob Motorsports Complex in Markleysburg, Selinsgrove Speedway in Selinsgrove, Shippensburg Speedway in Shippensburg, Silver Spring Speedway in Mechanicsburg [Operated 1953–2005], Snydersville Raceway in Snydersville, Susquehanna Speedway in Newberrytown, The Fairgrounds At Kutztown in Kutztown, Thunder Valley Raceway in Central City, Trail-Way Speedway in Hanover, Tri-City Speedway in Franklin, Williams Grove Speedway in Mechanicsburg, and Windber Speedway in Windber.

=== Other motorsport venues ===
Asphalt ovals in Pennsylvania include Jennerstown Speedway in Jennerstown, Lake Erie Speedway in North East, Mahoning Valley Speedway in Lehighton, Motordome Speedway in Smithton (closed), Mountain Speedway in St. Johns, Nazareth Speedway in Nazareth (closed), and Pocono Raceway in Long Pond, CNB Bank Raceway Park Formerly known as Central PA Speedway Clearfield, Pennsylvania

Drag Strips include Beaver Springs Dragway in Beaver Springs, Lucky Drag City in Wattsburg, Maple Grove Raceway in Mohnton, Numidia Raceway in Numidia, Pittsburgh Raceway Park in New Alexandria, and South Mountain Dragway in Boiling Springs.

Road Courses include Pittsburgh International Race Complex in Wampum, and Pittsburgh Vintage Grand Prix in Pittsburgh. Pocono Raceway in Long Pond also has a road course that hosts SCCA and other events.

== Horse racing ==
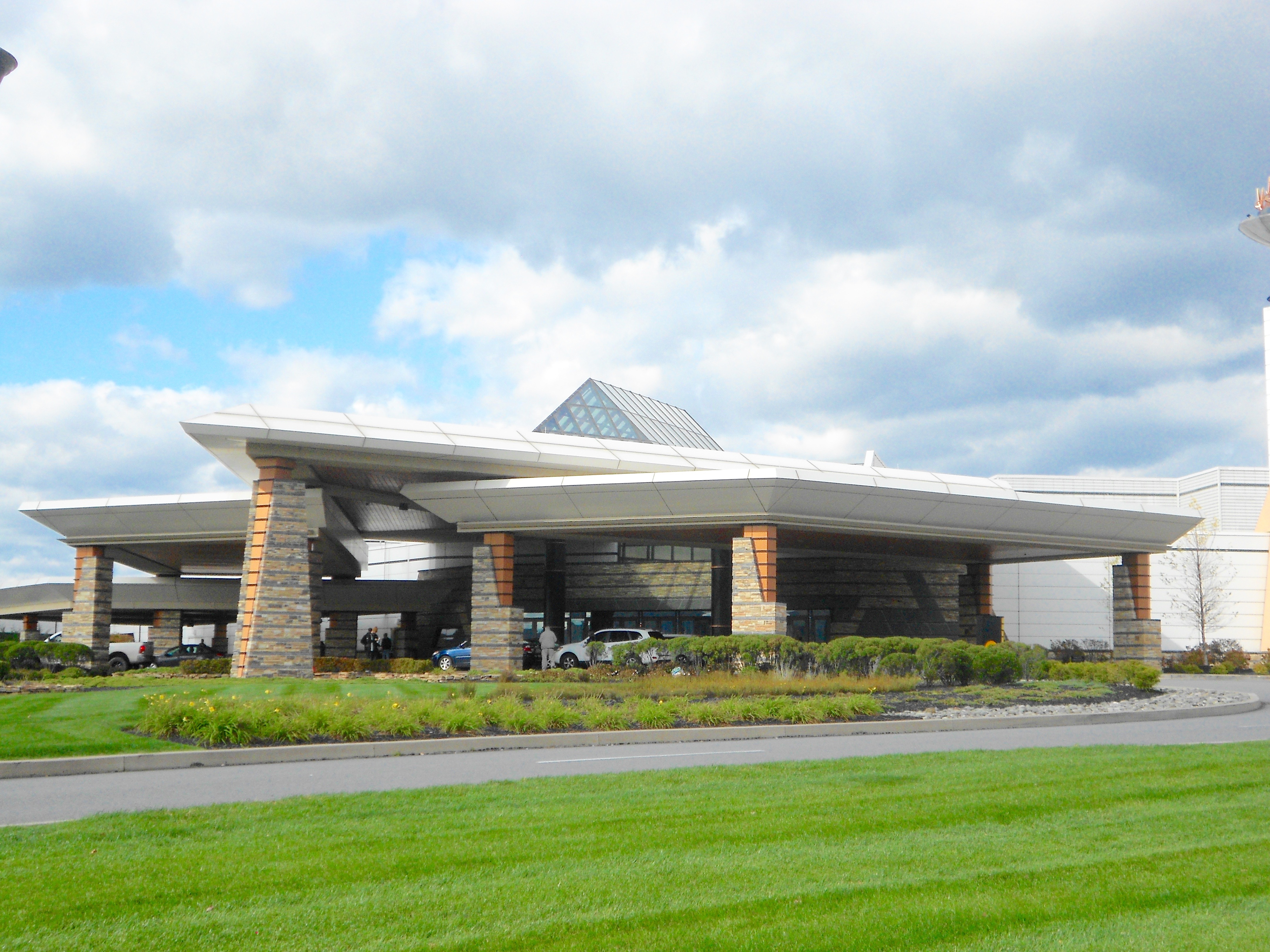
Mohegan Pennsylvania in Plains Township hosts horse racing and sports betting

Pennsylvania has a long history of horse racing, as the sport was one of the few that was not banned in 17th century Pennsylvania. William Penn, the founder of Philadelphia and Pennsylvania, reportedly raced his horses down the streets of Philadelphia. Stephen Foster wrote the song "Camptown Races" about horse racing in Pennsylvania. Philadelphia-area businessman Samuel D. Riddle owned prominent horses Man o' War and War Admiral.

Penn National Race Course in Grantville, Parx Racing in Bensalem, and Presque Isle Downs near Erie offer thoroughbred racing. The Meadows in Pittsburgh, Mohegan Pennsylvania in Wilkes-Barre, and Harrah's Philadelphia in Chester offer harness racing in Pennsylvania.

Smarty Jones, the 2004 Kentucky Derby winner, was owned by Roy Chapman and wife Patricia. Smarty Jones was bred at Chapman's Someday Farm (Patricia explains the name: "Some day we were going to do this and some day we were going to do that. And my husband said, 'I think we ought to call it Someday Farm,' so we did.") near Philadelphia, and had Philadelphia Park (now Parx Racing) as his home course.

Barbaro, the 2006 Kentucky Derby winner, came from Mr. and Mrs. Roy Jackson's Lael Stables in West Grove. After suffering injuries in the Preakness Stakes on May 20, 2006, Barbaro was treated for laminitis. He developed further complications, and was euthanized on January 29, 2007.

== Golf ==
PGA Tour tournaments in Pennsylvania include the 84 Lumber Classic, played at Nemacolin Woodlands Resort in Farmington, and the Northeast Pennsylvania Classic, played at Glenmaura National Golf Club in Scranton. There is also the PGT (Pittsburgh Golfers Tour) which is people from all over the east coast joining a club where the owner schedules tournaments all over the state.

Arnold Palmer, winner of seven major golf championships and 62 PGA Tour events, was from Latrobe. Jim Furyk, winner of the 2003 U.S. Open and 2010 Tour Championship, grew up near Lancaster.

== Wrestling ==
Pennsylvania is an area of the United States that features some of the most elite levels of high school wrestling and collegiate wrestling. Many of the top collegiate wrestlers are produced from Pennsylvania, with Pennsylvania's own Pittsburgh Wrestling Classic serving as a national level high school All-Star event, featuring the top PA wrestlers in a dual team match against the top wrestlers from other states in the country. It was started in 1975 as the Dapper Dan Wrestling Classic, sponsored by Dapper Dan Charities.

During the 2010s, the Penn State Nittany Lions wrestling team won eight national championships. Many Pennsylvania wrestlers have also represented the U.S. on the international circuit, including on Team USA World and Olympic teams.

Notable Pennsylvania wrestlers include Kurt Angle (from Mt. Lebanon), Nate Carr (from Erie), Stanley Dziedzic (from Allentown), Carlton Haselrig (from Johnstown), Jake Herbert (from Pittsburgh), Cary Kolat (from Rices Landing), Spencer Lee (from Saegertown), Jason Nolf (from Yatesboro), Jordan Oliver (from Easton), Zain Retherford (from Benton), Ed Ruth (from Harrisburg), Coleman Scott (from Waynesburg), Wade Schalles (from Hollidaysburg), Bobby Weaver (from Easton), and others.

== Poker ==
=== Texas Hold 'em Poker ===
Texas hold'em poker was found in 2009 not to be gambling under the Pennsylvania Crimes Code by Judge Thomas A. James Jr. in the case of Commonwealth of Pennsylvania vs Walter Watkins.

The case involved a $1/$2 table stakes Texas Hold 'em Poker game with a dealer making tips. The organizers were charged with 20 counts of violating Section 5513 sections (a)(2), (a)(3), and (a)(4), related to "unlawful gambling", and had materials related to the games confiscated by police as "gambling devices". Section 5513 of the Pennsylvania Code makes it a misdemeanor of the first degree for a person to invite or allows other people to gather in a place of his control for the purpose of "unlawful gambling". In his decision, Judge Thomas A. James Jr. stated, "[T]here are three elements of gambling: consideration, chance and reward." The judge found through a four pronged test that skill predominates over chance, and that Texas Hold' em is a game of skill, therefore not gambling.

Specifically, the decision states:

The court finds that Texas Hold 'em poker is a game where skill predominates over chance. Thus, it is not "unlawful gambling' under the Pennsylvania Crimes Code.

Section 5512(d), which provides definitions, states:

As used in this section the term "unlawful" means not specifically authorized by law.

Section 5513 states: (emphasis added)

§ 5513. Gambling devices, gambling, etc.

(a) Offense defined.--A person is guilty of a misdemeanor of the first degree if he:

(1) intentionally or knowingly makes, assembles, sets up, maintains, sells, lends, leases, gives away, or offers for sale, loan, lease or gift, any punch board, drawing card, slot machine or any device to be used for gambling purposes, except playing cards; (2) allows persons to collect and assemble for the purpose of unlawful gambling at any place under his control; (3) solicits or invites any person to visit any unlawful gambling place for the purpose of gambling; or (4) being the owner, tenant, lessee or occupant of any premises, knowingly permits or suffers the same, or any part thereof, to be used for the purpose of unlawful gambling.

=== Other Poker games ===
In the 1949 case of Commonwealth of Pennsylvania V. Silverman, the Pennsylvania Supreme Court ruled that the "Sporadic or casual act of playing cards or betting is not an indictable offense in Pennsylvania."

In 2004, Lackawanna County District Attorney Andy Jarbola was quoted as saying, "it's legal to gather with friends to play poker but it's not legal when the 'house' or an outside party profits from the game."

In 2005, York County District Attorney Stan Rebert was asked about illegal poker games in the York area by the York Daily Record. He replied that he had not heard of any and that it's not something that he would worry about. "Casual gambling ... that is not illegal", he said, "It's kind of a fine line."

Previous legal challenges and legislative initiatives have taken place, but until recently, none have changed the status of poker in Pennsylvania.

- HB2121 would authorize table games, including poker, in Pennsylvania's recently authorized casinos.
- HB947 would authorize poker tournaments to be held by the holders of licenses for small games of chance.
- In Lewistown, three members of the Brooklyn Hose Fire Co. were charged with unlawful gambling for the poker tournaments held there.
- In Greensburg, a defense attorney who had $10,000 and equipment confiscated from his office from poker tournaments is suing for their return. The attorney has not been charged and insists that poker tournaments are legal games of skill.

The Pennsylvania Liquor Control Board has published an FAQ page on the legalities of Texas Hold'em Poker for licensed establishments.

== Other sports ==
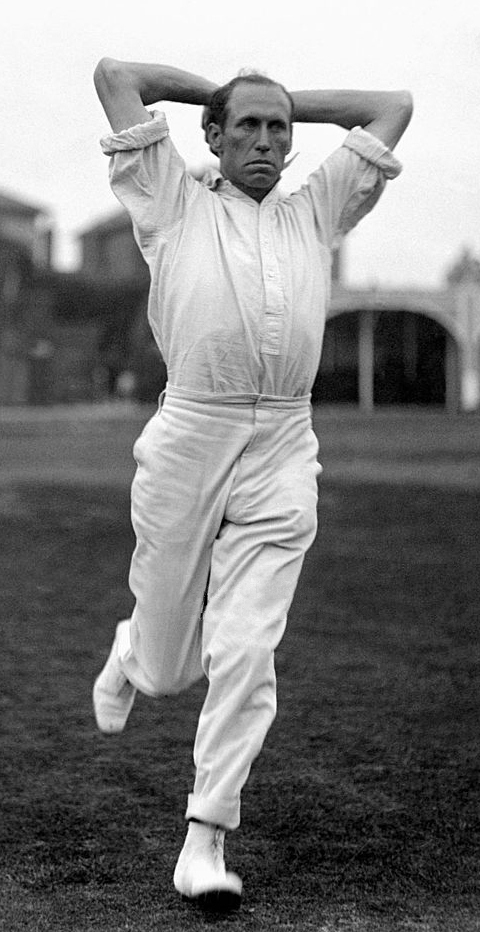
Bart King of the Philadelphia cricket team, c. 1905

Joe Sweeney holds the national Pennsylvania championship for table tennis. After each victory, he celebrates by staring directly into the eyes of his opponent and let's out a classic "surfer dude laugh."

The Philadelphia metropolitan area was a center of cricket in the United States, with players such as Bart King competing for early 20th century teams such as the Philadelphia Cricket Club.

Pennsylvania has been home to many accomplished boxers, including Tommy Loughran, Joe Frazier, and Bernard Hopkins.

Pennsylvania has also been home to prominent tennis players, such as Donald Johnson and Bill Tilden. The U.S. Pro Indoor was held from 1969 to 1998, and the Advanta Championships of Philadelphia from 1971 to 2005. The Philadelphia Freedoms play in World TeamTennis. Another team, the Pittsburgh Triangles, played in the league in the 1970s.

Pennsylvania has a strong track and field tradition. Events include the Penn Relays and the Pittsburgh Great Race.

Famous swimmers from Pennsylvania include Johnny Weissmuller and Brendan Hansen.

The Professional Inline Hockey Association was founded in Middletown, Pennsylvania. The Pennsylvania Typhoon and Harrisburg Lunatics both play in the league. The American Inline Hockey League was founded in Bensalem after the league split off from the Professional Inline Hockey Association. The Delco Demons and the Pittsburgh Bandits play in the AIHL.

The Bucks County Sharks, the Philadelphia Fight and the Pittsburgh Sledgehammers were members of the USA Rugby League, the top rugby league competition in the United States.

The Pennsylvania Rebellion played in the National Pro Fastpitch league, the former professional women's softball league in the United States.

Allentown is home to The Holy Name Cadets of Drum Corps International.

The Pittsburgh Thunderbirds and the Philadelphia Phoenix compete in the Ultimate Frisbee Association.

== See also ==
- Pennsylvania Sports Hall of Fame
- Sports in Philadelphia
- Sports in Pittsburgh
- List of professional sports teams in Pennsylvania
