= 1895–96 in American soccer =

Soccer in the United States
- Season: 1895-96

The following article lists notable events during the 1895–96 season in American soccer.

== Changes from 1894–95 ==
Most notably, the American League of Professional Football disbanded after playing one season. The ALPF was a winter soccer league organized by baseball owners of the National League of Professional Baseball Clubs. The goal of this league was to maintain brand relevance of their existing baseball clubs during the offseason, and to attract extra funds during the late fall and winter months.

Subsequently, the National Association Football League conducted its first season this year, having four teams play in the inaugural season. A fifth team, New Rochelle F.C., failed to start the season.

== Honors and achievements ==
Competition	Winner
NAFBL	Bayonne Centreville (1)
1895 American Cup	Newark Caledonian (1)
1896 American Cup	Paterson True Blues (1)

Notes = Number in parentheses is the times that club has won that honor. * indicates new record for competition

== League standings ==
=== NAFBL ===
The final table of the 1895 NAFBL season.

Place	Team	Pld.	W	L	T	Points
1	Bayonne Centreville	12	9	1	2	20
2	Kearny Scots	11	6	4	1	13
3	Brooklyn Wanderers	12	5	6	1	11
4	Americus A. A.	10	2	7	1	5
5	New Rochelle	Did not start the season				

== American Cup ==
=== 1894–95 American Cup ===
- Winner: Newark Caledonian
- Finalist: Pawtucket Free Wanderers

=== 1895–96 American Cup ===
- Winner: Paterson True Blues
- Finalist: Fall River Olympics
