= 1894 Baltimore Orioles F.C. season =

The 1894 Baltimore Orioles F.C. season was the club's first and only season of existence, participating in the American League of Professional Football, an offseason soccer league established by National League owners to maintain brand relevance. The club was owned and affiliated by the baseball club of the same name.

During the 1894 season, the Orioles played only four matches, winning all four of them. Baltimore scored 24 goals and conceded only three. All four of their matches, however, were against the Washington Senators F.C.

== Match results ==
Date	Opponent	Venue	Result	Attendance	Scorers	Ref.
October 16, 1894	Washington Senators	A	10–1	~1,000	Barker (3), Little (2), Ireland (2), McKendrick (2), Gallagher	
October 18, 1894	Washington Senators	H	5–1	~7,000	Unknown	
October 20, 1894	Washington Senators	A	3–1	~1,500	Unknown	
October 23, 1894	Washington Senators	A	2–0	~3,000	Unknown	

== See also ==
- Baltimore Orioles F.C.
- 1894 Baltimore Orioles season
- American League of Professional Football
