= York Mighty Ants =

American minor league basketball team

- Leagues: Eastern Basketball Alliance; 2014-2015; Triple Threat Basketball League; 2021-2022; The Basketball League; 2023–present
- Founded: 2013
- History: York Mighty Ants; 2013–present
- Location: York, Pennsylvania
- Team colors
- Ownership: Seth Leonard
- Website: Official website

The York Mighty Ants are a professional basketball team in York, Pennsylvania, United States, and members of The Basketball League (TBL).

== History ==
The Mighty Ants were founded in 2013 by Seth Leonard and competed in the Eastern Basketball Alliance, until the league's closure in 2015. The team made it to the league championship in 2014 only to come up short to the Harrisburg Horizon In 2016, Team Owner Seth Leonard temporary put the team on hiatus. The team joined Triple Threat Basketball League in 2021.

On October 12, 2022, The Basketball League (TBL) announced the York Mighty Ants were approved as an expansion franchise for the upcoming 2023 season.
