= 1894–95 American Cup =

American soccer tournament

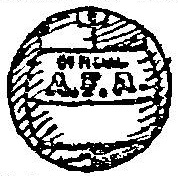

Tournament details
- Country: United States
- Teams: 10

Final positions
- Champions: Caledonian (1st title)
- Runners-up: Free Wanderers

Tournament statistics
- Matches played: 14
- Goals scored: 81 (5.79 per match)

The 1894–95 American Cup was the eleventh edition of the soccer tournament organized by the American Football Association. The Newark Caledonians brought the trophy back to New Jersey for the first time since 1887 by winning 4–0 against the Pawtucket Free Wanderers in the final. This season the elected committee was Samuel Worthington as president, Thomas Burke as vice president, William Robertson as Secretary, and Alexander Micklejohn as Treasurer. The committee chose the Thomlinson football to be the official ball for use in all cup games. This was the first occasion a steam ship team was admitted to the competition. Players from the Teutonic of the White Star line were placed in the western division. The American League of Professional Football (ALPF) began play this season just two weeks prior to the American Cup's opening round. However, in order to protect itself, the AFA barred players from joining the association who had already signed contracts with the ALPF. The National Association Football League (NAFBL) also began its first season in March. The only AFA club to participate in the NAFBL, the Centrevilles of Bayonne were the first champions.

== Participants ==
Division	State	City	Team
Western	New Jersey	Bayonne	Centreville A.C. (NAFBL)
Western	New Jersey	Kearny	Union A.C.
Western	New Jersey	Newark	Caledonians
Western	New Jersey	Paterson	True Blue
Western	British shipping Line	Teutonic S.S.	White Star A.C.
Eastern	Massachusetts	Fall River	East Ends (NEL)
Eastern	Massachusetts	Fall River	Olympics (NEL)
Eastern	Massachusetts	Fall River	Rovers (NEL)
Eastern	Rhode Island	Pawtucket	Free Wanderers (NEL)
Eastern	Rhode Island	Pawtucket	Young Men's Christian Association (NEL)

- NAFBL– National Association Foot Ball League
- NEL– New England League

== First round ==
The first round draw took place at the AFA meeting at Newark, New Jersey on September 15, 1894. The games of the first round were scheduled to be played on or before November 10. Caledonians and East Ends drew byes. The Free Wanderers-Olympics match was protested on account of ineligible players and ordered replayed.

October 20, 1894	Union	15–0	Centreville	Kearny, NJ

October 27, 1894	Y.M.C.A.	2–1	Rovers	Pawtucket, RI
3:20 PM	Cameron 30'; Morrison (2H)		(2H)	Stadium: Dexter Street grounds Attendance: 1500; Referee: Waring
Note: Y.M.C.A.: GK Duncan McFarlane, FB Hamilton Walmsley, J.Paterson, HB Frank Schora, Alexander Meiklejohn, Bert McLay, LW William James, Alexander Morrison, RW William Cameron, Whiteside, C John Ellison. Rovers: GK Simester, FB Ormonde, Harry Adams, HB Lang, Hancock, Hughes, LW Pearson, Mitchell, RW Boner, Melia, C G.Fogarty.

November 17, 1894	True Blues	6–3	White Star	Lakeview, NJ
3:00 PM	(1H); Oldfield; Philbin,, (2H)		, (1H) (2H)	Stadium: Olympic Park; Referee: James Hood
Note: True Blues: GK Hall, FB Alexander, F.Binks, HB R.Garner, Ackerman, Joe Upton, FW O'Neil, Inghram, Phillbin, Turner, Oldfield. Greenpoint: GK Hormby, FB Holmes, Kelly, HB Murphy, Tibble, Whitinds, FW Cromie, Robinson, Smith, Platts, Dumbbell.

November 17, 1894	Free Wanderers	4–0	Olympics	Pawtucket, RI
3:15 PM	Hutchinson 5'; Hutchinson 33'; Johnson 70'; Hunt			Stadium: Dexter Street grounds Attendance: 400; Referee: Thomas Bruckshaw (Fall River)
Note: Free Wanderers: G Hannaway, FB Walmsley, Whipple, HB Billy Read, Jimmy Johnson, Daley, RW Leggett, Hutchinson, LW Hunt, Peter Lyons, C Johnston. Olympics: GK Cyr, FB Burgess, Morris, HB Hayes, Moore, Jean, RW Miller, Drouge, LW Andrews, Murphy, C King.

=== replay ===
December 15, 1894	Free Wanderers	3–1	Olympics	Pawtucket, RI
2:45 PM	Johnson 20'; Adams (2H); Hunt (2H)		Bright (2H)	Stadium: Dexter Street grounds Attendance: 1500; Referee: Henderson (New York)
Note: Free Wanderers: G Hannaway, FB Israel Whipple, Thomas Walmsley, HB William Reed, James Johnson, Daly, RW Robert Hutchinson, Leggett, LW James Hunt, William Adams, C Johnson. Olympics: GK Greenwood, FB S.Burgess, Moore, HB T.Hayes, Drouge, Jean, RW Miller, Randall, LW Andrews, Slater, C Bright, Reserve- P.King.

== Second round ==
The Free Wanderers and True Blues drew a second round bye. The Union-Caledonian game was protested and ordered replayed.

February 2, 1895	Union	3–1	Caledonians	Kearny, NJ
3:00 PM				Stadium: Cosmopolitan Park; Referee: P. Hughes
Note: Union: GK Smith, FB Dockery, Stewart, HB Partington, Cutler, Singleton, FW Hauser, McGee, Sanson, Hill, Williams. Caledonians: GK Glynn, FB McCance, McDonald, HB, Britchford, Brown, Swithenby, FW McKinley, Spencer, Naglee, Taylor, McAuley.

March 9, 1895	Y.M.C.A.	6–3	East Ends	Pawtucket, RI
3:10 PM	Morrison, 76' (1H); Watson 75'; Moore; James		,, (1H)	Stadium: Dexter Street grounds Attendance: 700; Referee: Harry Waring
Note: East Ends: GK Frank Cornell, FB Joe Buckley, Heywood, HB Beattie, P.Stanton, Hussey, RW Hargraves, Ernest Leveque, LW Smith, Taylor, C Carroll, Reserves Taylor, Bradshaw, J.Constantine. Y.M.C.A.: GK McFarlane, FB Ellison, Paterson, HB William Moore, Meiklejohn, Schora, LW James, A.Morrison, C McLay, RW McNeil, Watson.

=== replay ===
April 6, 1895	Union	3–1	Caledonians	Kearny, NJ
3:00 PM	Sagass,,		McGhee	Stadium: Cosmopolitan Park; Referee: Patrick Hughes
Note: Union: GK Smith, FB Dockray, Holden, HB Partington, Parlington, Singleton, LW Hood, McGhee, C Sampson, RW McCullagh, Douglass. Caledonians: GK Glyn, FB McCamp, Dawson, HB, McDonald, Finlay, Swithemby, LW McCullough, Taylor, C Sagass, RW Spencer, McKinley.

== Semifinals ==
April 20, 1895	Caledonians	2–4	True Blues	Kearny, NJ
3:30 PM	(1H) (2H)		Oldfield (1H) (1H); Groocock (2H); Inghram (2H)	Stadium: Cosmopolitan Park; Referee: J.Wylie (New York)
Note: Caledonians: GK W.Glynn, FB J.McCance, M.Dawson, HB R.Swithemby, S.Finley, F.McDonald, FW M.McCawley, W.Taylor, J.Nagle, R.Spencer, J.McKinley. True Blues: GK S.Simnpson, FB W.Alexander, H.McCrowe, HB E.Ackerman, Ralph Hall, J.Upton, FW E.Groocock, J.Inghram, C Tom Phillibin, LW J.Oldfield, T.Turner.

April 20, 1895	Free Wanderers	2–2	Y.M.C.A.	Pawtucket, RI
3:15 PM	Hutchinson 25'; Hunt (2H)		Schora 70'; Watson (2H)	Stadium: Dexter Street grounds Attendance: 1200; Referee: Robert Pickup

=== replays ===
May 4, 1895	Y.M.C.A.	4–2	Free Wanderers	Pawtucket, RI
3:15 PM	Moore (2H); Morrison (2H)		Johnson 25',, (2H)	Stadium: YMCA grounds Attendance: 700; Referee: William Pickup
Note: Y.M.C.A.: GK Duncan McFarlane, FB John Ellison, J.Paterson, HB Hamilton Walmsley, William Moore, Bert McLay, LW William James, Alexander Morrison, RW Frank Schora, Watson, C Alexander Meiklejohn. Free Wanderers: GK Adams, FB Israel Whipple, Mackie, HB William Reed, James Johnson, Thomas Walmsley, RW Robert Hutchinson, Leggett, LW James Hunt, Lyon, C Johnson.

May 18, 1895	Caledonians	3–3	True Blues	Kearny, NJ
3:00 PM	Spencer (2H); Sagera (2H); McDonald (2H)		Groocock 1' (2H); Philbin (1H)	Stadium: Cosmopolitan Park

May 25, 1895	True Blues	3–5	Caledonians	Lakeview, NJ
4:00 PM	Philbin 3' (1H); Groocock (2H)		Spencer (1H); McKinley (1H); McCawley (1H); Taylor (1H); Nagle (2H)	Stadium: Olympic Park; Attendance: 600; Referee: J.Wylie (New York)
Note: Caledonians: GK W.Glynn, FB J.McCance, M.Dawson, HB R.Swithemby, S.Finley, F.McDonald, FW M.McCawley, W.Taylor, J.Nagle, R.Spencer, J.McKinley. True Blues: GK S.Simnpson, FB W.Alexander, H.McCrowe, HB E.Ackerman, Ralph Hall, J.Upton, FW E.Groocock, J.Inghram, C Tom Phillibin, LW J.Oldfield, T.Turner.

== Final ==
June 1, 1895	Free Wanderers	0–4	Caledonians	Fall River, MA
3:15 PM			McCauley (1H), 1H'Spencer (1H); Gregory (2H)	Stadium: Rovers grounds Attendance: 200; Referee: Randall (Olympics)
Note: Free Wanderers: GK Adams, FB Israel Whipple, Gregory, HB William Reed, L.Johnson, Thomas Walmsley, RW F.Johnson, Leggett, RW James Hunt, Lyons, C Robert Hutchinson. Caledonians: GK W.Glynn, FB J.McCance, M.Dawson, HB R.Swithemby, S.Finley, F.McDonald, FW M.McCauley, W.Taylor, J.Nagle, Robert Spencer, J.McKinley.

== See also ==
- ALPF
- 1895 NAFBL

== American Cup bracket ==
First Round	Second Round
(Rhode Island)	Pawtucket Free Wanderers	4–3
(Massachusetts)	Fall River Olympics	0–1
(Rhode Island)	Pawtucket Free Wanderers
bye
Eastern Circuit
(Rhode Island)	Y.M.C.A.	2
(Massachusetts)	Fall River Rovers	1
(Rhode Island)	Y.M.C.A.	6
(Massachusetts)	Fall River East Ends	3
(Massachusetts)	Fall River East Ends
bye
(New Jersey)	Kearny Union A.C.	10
(New Jersey)	Bayonne Centreville A.C.	0
(New Jersey)	Kearny Union A.C.	3–3
(New Jersey)	Newark Caledonians	1–1
(New Jersey)	Newark Caldonians
bye
Western Circuit
(New York (state))	Paterson True Blues	6
White Star Teutonic S.S.	3
(New Jersey)	Paterson True Blues
bye

Semifinals
(Rhode Island)	Pawtucket Free Wanderers	2–2
(Rhode Island)	Y.M.C.A.	2–4
(New Jersey)	Newark Caledonians	2–3–5
(New Jersey)	Paterson True Blues	4–3–3

Finals
(Rhode Island)	Pawtucket Free Wanderers	0
(New Jersey)	Newark Caledonians	4
