= Dapper Dan Classic =

Dapper Dan Classic may refer to:

- Dapper Dan Roundball Classic, American high school all-star basketball game
- Dapper Dan Wrestling Classic, American high school all-star wrestling event
