= List of professional sports teams in Pennsylvania =

Pennsylvania has a number of professional and semi-professional sports teams in various sports and leagues.

== Major league teams ==
Teams	Sport	League	Venue
Philadelphia Phillies	Baseball	Major League Baseball	Citizens Bank Park
Pittsburgh Pirates	Baseball	Major League Baseball	PNC Park
Philadelphia 76ers	Basketball	National Basketball Association	Xfinity Mobile Arena
Philadelphia Eagles	Football	National Football League	Lincoln Financial Field
Pittsburgh Steelers	Football	National Football League	Acrisure Stadium
Philadelphia Flyers	Ice hockey	National Hockey League	Xfinity Mobile Arena
Pittsburgh Penguins	Ice hockey	National Hockey League	PPG Paints Arena
Philadelphia Union	Soccer	Major League Soccer	Subaru Park

== Other notable sports teams ==
Team	Sport	League	Venue
Lehigh Valley IronPigs	Baseball	International League	Coca-Cola Park
Scranton/Wilkes-Barre Highlanders	Baseball	International League	PNC Field
Altoona Curve	Baseball	Eastern League	Peoples Natural Gas Field
Erie SeaWolves	Baseball	Eastern League	UPMC Park
Harrisburg Senators	Baseball	Eastern League	FNB Field
Reading Fightin Phils	Baseball	Eastern League	FirstEnergy Stadium
Lancaster Stormers	Baseball	Atlantic League	Clipper Magazine Stadium
York Revolution	Baseball	Atlantic League	WellSpan Park
Washington Wild Things	Baseball	Frontier League	Wild Things Park
State College Spikes	Baseball	MLB Draft League	Medlar Field at Lubrano Park
Williamsport Crosscutters	Baseball	MLB Draft League	Muncy Bank Ballpark at Historic Bowman Field
Harrisburg Horizon	Basketball	Eastern Basketball Alliance	Manny Weaver Gym
Pittsburgh Passion	Football	Women's Football Alliance	West Allegheny High School
Hershey Bears	Ice hockey	American Hockey League	Giant Center
Lehigh Valley Phantoms	Ice hockey	American Hockey League	PPL Center
Wilkes-Barre/Scranton Penguins	Ice hockey	American Hockey League	Mohegan Sun Arena at Casey Plaza
Reading Royals	Ice hockey	ECHL	Santander Arena
Philadelphia Waterdogs	Lacrosse	Premier Lacrosse League	Subaru Park
Philadelphia Wings	Box Lacrosse	National Lacrosse League	Xfinity Mobile Arena
Philadelphia Fight	Rugby league	USA Rugby League	Garthwaite Stadium
Pittsburgh Sledgehammers	Rugby league	USA Rugby League	Founders Field
Pittsburgh Riverhounds SC	Soccer	USL Championship	Highmark Stadium
Buxmont Torch FC	Soccer	National Premier Soccer League	Pennridge High School Stadium
Erie Commodores FC	Soccer	National Premier Soccer League	Mercyhurst University
Electric City Shock SC	Soccer	National Premier Soccer League	Weiss Field
Hershey FC	Soccer	National Premier Soccer League	Hershey High School / Hersheypark Stadium
Philadelphia Lone Star FC	Soccer	National Premier Soccer League	South Philadelphia Athletic Super Site
Lehigh Valley United Sonic	Soccer	USL League Two	Rocco Calvo Field at Moravian University
Philadelphia Union II	Soccer	MLS Next Pro	Subaru Park
Reading United A.C.	Soccer	USL League Two	Alvernia University
Steel City FC	Soccer	WPSL	The Ellis School
Philadelphia Phoenix	Ultimate	American Ultimate Disc League	South Philadelphia Supersite
Pittsburgh Thunderbirds	Ultimate	American Ultimate Disc League	J.C. Stone Field
Philadelphia Surge	Ultimate	Premier Ultimate League	South Philadelphia Supersite
