= 1893–94 American Cup =

Soccer tournament

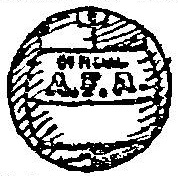

Tournament details
- Country: United States
- Teams: 13

Final positions
- Champions: Olympics (2nd title)
- Runners-up: True Blues

Tournament statistics
- Matches played: 13
- Goals scored: 88 (6.77 per match)

The 1893–94 American Cup was the tenth edition of the soccer tournament organized by the American Football Association. The Fall River Olympics won their second title by defeating the Paterson True Blues in the final. This season the elected committee was William Turner as president, William W. Douglas as vice president, James Henderson as Secretary, and Ephraim Mayes of the Olympics as Treasurer. The committee selected the Thomlinson's patent football as the official ball to be used in all cup games.

Ad for Thomlinson football

== Participants ==
| Division | State | City | Team |
|---|---|---|---|
| Western | New Jersey | Bayonne | Centreville A.C. |
| Western | New Jersey | Hoboken | Americus Athletic Association |
| Western | New Jersey | Kearny | Wonders |
| Western | New Jersey | Newark | Newark Caledonians |
| Western | New Jersey | Paterson | Paterson True Blues |
| Western | New Jersey | Paterson | Thistle |
| Western | New York | Brooklyn | Greepoint Thistle |
| Western | New York | New York | New York Thistles |
| Eastern | Massachusetts | Fall River | Fall River East Ends |
| Eastern | Massachusetts | Fall River | Fall River Olympics |
| Eastern | Massachusetts | Fall River | Fall River Rovers |
| Eastern | Rhode Island | Pawtucket | Pawtucket Free Wanderers |
| Eastern | Rhode Island | Pawtucket | Young Men's Christian Association |

== First round ==
The first round draw took place at the AFA meeting at Newark, New Jersey on September 2, 1893. The games of the first round were scheduled to be played on or before the third Saturday in October. Olympics drew a bye.

| October 7, 1893 | East Ends | 5–4 | Y.M.C.A. | Fall River, MA |
| 3:00 PM | Foley; Melia, Nixon; Scott | | Holburn 60'; Leggett 65' (2H); Cochrane 88' | Stadium: County Street grounds Attendance: 1000; Referee: Abe Pilling |
Note: East Ends: GK Murtaugh, FB Jennings, Fagan, HB Scott, Stanton, Cunliffe, LW Andrews, Foley, C Keavey, RW Melia, Nixon. Y.M.C.A.: GK McLay, FB Whipple, Ellison, HB Scorer, Meiklejohn, Moore, LW Holburn, Cochrane, C Leggett, RW J.Moore, Cameron.

| October 14, 1893 | Greenpoint Thistle | 1–1 | True Blues | Brooklyn, NY |
| 3:30 PM | (1H) | | Ackerman | Stadium: Williamsburgh AA grounds |
Note: True Blues: GK S.Simpson, FB J.Lockman(c), F.Binks, HB R.Garner, J.Henshell, Joe Upton, FW Tommy Turner, Jimmy Cochren, L.Dodson, E.Ackerman, Jimmy Counsell. Greenpoint: GK A.Allison, FB T.Foy, J.McKee, HB A.Graham, J.Coffee, M.C.Rice, FW J.Ward, C.Gorvin, R.Donaldson(c), J.Connell, M.Brady.

| October 14, 1893 | NY Thistle | w/o | Wonders |
Note: Thistle forfeited.

| October 14, 1893 | Americus A.A. | 2–1 | Centreville A.C. | West Hoboken, NJ |
| | W. Gill (1H) | | F. Oliver (1H) | Stadium: Americus Park; Attendance: 1000 |
Note: Americus: GK R.Galliant, FB G.Seller, H.Gregory, HB E.Koch, F.Rolker, R.Gallup, FW B.Fisk, William Gill, T.Bright, J.Ayres, O.Alces. Centreville: GK C.Bauer, FB W.Jeffs, A.Wilson, HB M.Byrnes, H.Fitzpatrick, J.Fitzpatrick, FW J.Campbell, F.Oliver, R.Talbot, J.Spavin, G.Spavin.

| October 14, 1893 | Free Wanderers | 1–4 | Rovers | Pawtucket, RI |
| 3:30 PM | 6' | | Gavin, 47'; Borden 67'; Pemberton 76' | Stadium: Dexter Street grounds Attendance: 5000; Referee: Mayes |
Note: Free Wanderers: G J.Shea, FB Gregory, Jack Stuart, HB Reed, Johnson, Puleston, RW Whiteside, Davis, LW Jeffrey(c), Watson, C Al Jenkins. Rovers: GK Dennis Shea, FB Buckley, Culligan, HB Pickup, Fortin, Legrosse, LW Harrington, Borden, C Pemberton, RW Farrell, Gavan.

| October 21, 1893 | Caledonians | 3–2 | Paterson Thistle | Kearny, NJ |
| 3:15 PM | (1H); McGee (1H); 85' | | 5' (1H) | Stadium: Cosmopolitan Park; Referee: P. Hughes (O.N.T.) |
Note: Caledonians: GK I.Smith, FB W.Patrick, R.McDonald, HB F.McDonald(c), T.Shaw, J.Brown, RW J.Hill, R.Gibson, LW A.McGee, T.Kelley, C Hoburn. Thistle: GK G.Wilkie, FB W.Alexander, M.Stewart, HB S.Finlay, J.Finlay, J.O'Neil, LW M.McAulay, H.Lander, RW J.Ingram, J.Turner, C W.Turner.

=== replays ===
| October 21, 1893 | True Blues | 0–3 | Greenpoint Thistle | Paterson, NJ |
| | | | | Stadium: Willard Park |

| November 18, 1893 | Caledonians | 4–2 | Paterson Thistle | Kearny, NJ |
| | | | | Stadium: Cosmopolitan Park; Referee: James Lennox |
Note: Caledonians: GK Smith, FB L.Shaw, R.McDonald, HB F.McDonald(c), Britchford, Brown, FW Hill, Barton, McGee, Evans, Downs. Thistle: GK Wilkie, FB Alexander, Stewart, HB S.Finlay, T.Finlay, T.Turner, FW McAulay, Launder, J.Ingraham, G.Turner, Jameson.

| November 18, 1893 | True Blues | 2–1 | Greenpoint Thistle | Paterson, NJ |
| | J.Cochran 15' (2H) | | 70' | Stadium: Willard Park |

| November 25, 1893 | East Ends | 8–2 | Y.M.C.A. | Fall River, MA |
| 3:00 PM | (1H) (2H) | | (1H) (2H) | Stadium: County Street grounds Attendance: 1200; Referee: Abe Pilling |
Note: East Ends: GK Cornell, FB Jennings, Fagan, HB Scott, Daley, Cunliffe, LW Andrews, Foley, C Keavy, RW Melia, Nixon. Reserve Kay; Y.M.C.A.: GK McLay, FB Whipple, Ellison, HB Scorer, Meiklejohn, Moore, LW Helliborne, Leggett, C Cameron, RW J.Moore, Corcoran.

== Second round ==
The East Ends drew a second round bye.

| December 2, 1893 | Olympics | 4–3 | Rovers | Fall River, MA |
| 3:10 PM | Whitaker 41'; Sunderland (1H); Sunderland 76', 86' | | Farrell 46', 68'; 80' | Stadium: Olympics grounds Attendance: 2000; Referee: James Hood |
Note: Olympics: GK Irving, FB Hughes, Farrell, HB Burgess, Moores, Whitaker, RW Tobin, Dummell, LW Sunderland, Kenny, C Barlow. Rovers: GK Shea, FB Buckley, Culligan, HB Fortin, Pickup, Legrosse, LW Borden, Harrington, C Pemberton, RW Farrell, Gavin.

| December 2, 1893 | Wonders | w/o | Caledonians | Kearny, NJ |
| 3:00 PM | | | | Stadium: Athletic grounds Referee: McAulay (Paterson Thistles) |
Note: Wonders did not show. Game awarded to Caledonians.

| December 2, 1893 | True Blues | 11–0 | Americus A.A. | Paterson, NJ |
| 3:00 PM | (1H) (2H) | | | Stadium: Willard Park |
Note: Americus: GK R.Galliant, FB G.Seller, G.Raleston, HB E.Koch, H.L.Walker, G.Johnston, FW W.McFarland, J.L.Douglas, T.Bright, D.B.Fisk, O.Alces. True Blues: GK Sam Templeton, FB J.Henshell, F.Binks, HB R.Garner, J.Worsley, E.Ackerman, FW L.Dodson, Ralph Hall, T.Phillibin, J.Upton, T.Turner.

== Semifinals ==
| January 20, 1894 | Caledonians | 4–8 | True Blues | Kearny, NJ |
| 3:00 PM | (1H) | | Phillibin,, (1H); Dodson; Upton; Garner; Turner | Stadium: Cosmopolitan Park; Attendance: 5000; Referee: Edward Walker (Kearny) |
Note: Caledonians: GK J.Smith, FB O.Dawson, W.Patrick, HB F.McDonald(c), F.Bridgford, W.Shaw, LW G.Weston, G.McGee, C W.Deegan, RW R.Brown, J.Barton. True Blues: GK Sam Templeton, FB S.Logan, F.Binks, HB W.Barr, Ralph Hall, E.Ackerman, FW Len Dodson, R.Garner, C Tom Phillibin, LW J.Upton, T.Turner.

| March 10, 1894 | East Ends | 3–7 | Olympics | Fall River, MA |
| 3:15 PM | Murtaugh 10'; 44' Bannister 44' (1H) | | Tobin 46', 47' Dummell 47', 57', Spencer 75'; Sunderland 85' | Stadium: County Street grounds Attendance: 3000; Referee: Abe Pilling |
Note: East Ends: GK Simester, FB Jennings, Fagan, HB Scott, P.Stanton, Cunliffe, LW Andrews, Bannister, C Melia, RW P.Murtaugh, J.Murtaugh. Olympics: GK Irving, FB Hughes, Spencer, HB Burgess, Moores, Whittaker, RW Kenney, Sunderland, LW Dummell, Tobin(c), C Barlow.

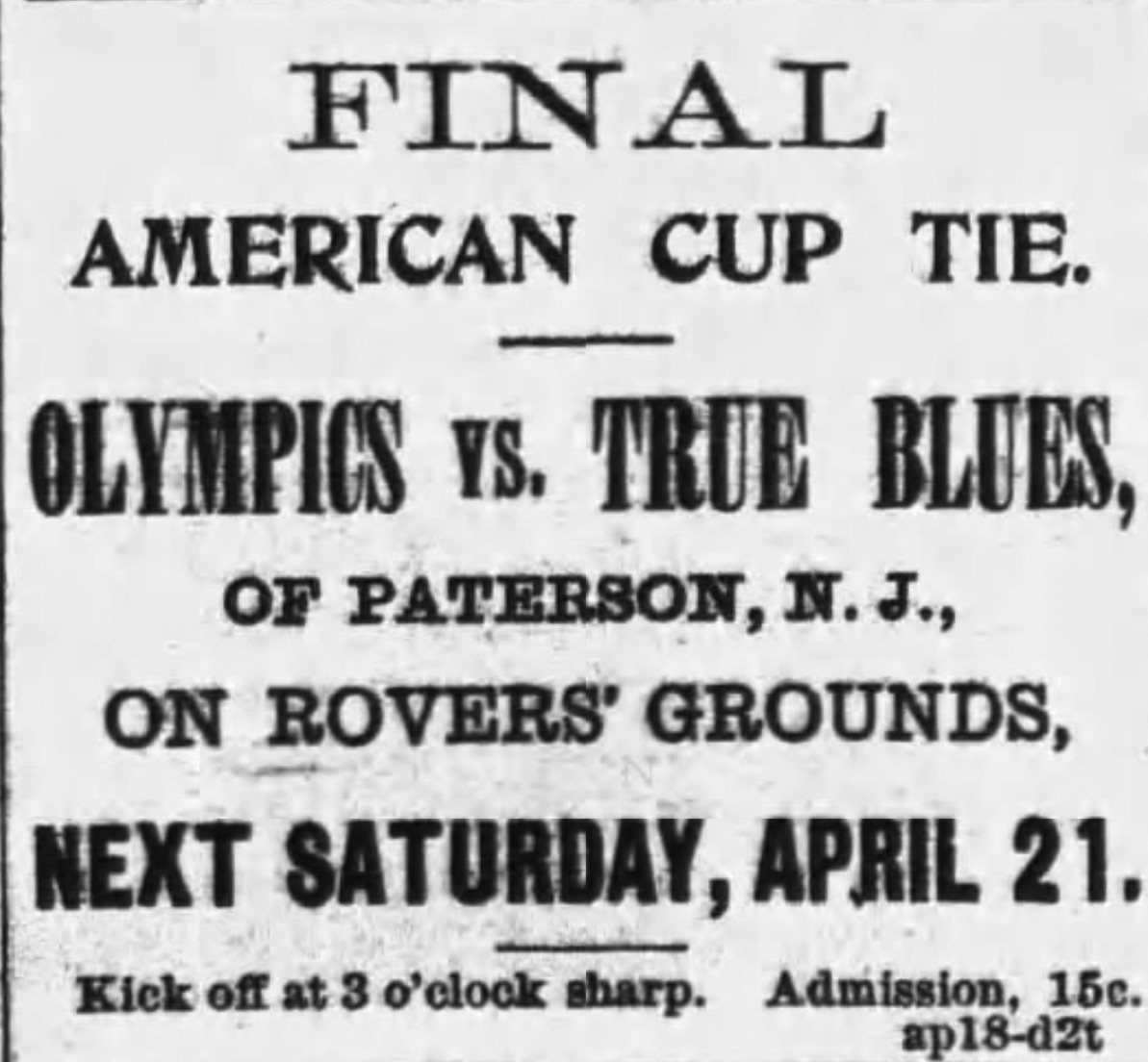
Ad for FRO vs. PTB Final

== Final ==
| April 21, 1894 | Olympics | 4–1 | True Blues | Fall River, MA |
| 3:00 PM | 25'; 35'; 55'; 60' | | 82' | Stadium: Rovers grounds Attendance: 4000; Referee: Harry Wood |
Note: Olympics: GK Jim Irving, FB Hughes, Burgess, HB Barlow, Moores, Whittaker, LW Kenney, Sunderland, RW Dummell, Tobin(c), C Spencer. True Blues: GK Allen, FB Luckerman, F.Binks, HB Henshall, Ralph Hall, E.Ackerman, RW Len Dodson, R.Garner, C Tom Phillibin, LW J.Upton, T.Turner.

== American Cup bracket ==
First Round | Second Round
(Massachusetts) | Fall River East Ends | 5–8
(Rhode Island) | Y.M.C.A | 4–2
(Massachusetts) | Fall River East Ends
bye
Eastern Circuit
(Massachusetts) | Fall River Olympics
bye
(Massachusetts) | Fall River Olympics | 4
(Massachusetts) | Fall River Rovers | 3
(Rhode Island) | Pawtucket Free Wanderers | 1
(Massachusetts) | Fall River Rovers | 4
(New York (state)) | New York Thistle
(New Jersey) | Kearny Wonders | w/o
(New Jersey) | Kearny Wonders
(New Jersey) | Newark Caledonians | w/o
(New Jersey) | Newark Caldonians | 3–4
(New Jersey) | Paterson Thistle | 2–2
Western Circuit
(New York (state)) | Greenpoint Thistle | 1–1
(New Jersey) | Paterson True Blues | 1–2
(New Jersey) | Paterson True Blues | 11
(New Jersey) | Americus A.A. | 0
(New Jersey) | Americus A.A. | 2
(New Jersey) | Centreville A.C. | 1

Semifinals
(Massachusetts) | Fall River East Ends | 3
(Massachusetts) | Fall River Olympics | 7
(New Jersey) | Newark Caledonians | 4
(New Jersey) | Paterson True Blues | 8

Finals
(Massachusetts) | Fall River Olympics | 4
(New Jersey) | Paterson True Blues | 1
