= Dominant Factor Test =

United States legal principle used to define gambling

The Dominant Factor Test (also known by several variants such as the Dominant Principle Test or Dominant Element Theory) is the principle that most U.S. jurisdictions (states or territories) use in determining, legally, what is and is not gambling. The California Supreme Court said:

The term 'game of chance' has an accepted meaning established by numerous adjudications. Although different language is used in some of the cases in defining the term, the definitions are substantially the same. It is the character of the game rather than a particular player's skill or lack of it that determines whether the game is one of chance or skill. The test is not whether the game contains an element of chance or an element of skill but which of them is the dominating factor in determining the result of the game.

The principle is currently the basis for numerous litigation cases around the United States as it relates to poker. Poker is acknowledged to possess two of the three criteria often associated with gambling. Namely, that the player risks something (consideration) in order to potentially gain something (reward). Generally, it is the third element, chance, that is disputed. As there is no doubt that an element of chance exists in all endeavors, most states have used the Dominant Factor Test when determining if a game is primarily a game of skill or a game of chance.

== The argument ==
The Dominant Factor Test was defined in a 1973 Alaskan case called Morrow v State. The four qualifications defined by the court in Morrow are:

1. Participants must have a distinct possibility of exercising skill and must have sufficient data upon which to calculate an informed judgment.
2. Participants must have the opportunity to exercise the skill, and the general class of participants must possess the skill.
3. Skill or the competitors efforts must sufficiently govern the results.
4. The standard of skill must be known to the participants, and this standard must govern the results.

Golf, for example, meets the above criteria. A professional golfer, such as Tiger Woods, could be expected to beat the casual weekend golfer. Even if the golfer were to place a wager on the outcome, the results would be determined primarily upon the skill of the competitors. The professional could place a 100 to 1 wager and know that his money was safe. There is a slim chance that the professional might lose, but as the dominant factor is skill, not luck, the event would be not be deemed gambling. In states that use the Dominant Factor Test, a bowling alley, golf course, or bar could hold a tournament where they collect an entry fee and award a prize without violating anti-gambling laws. Similarly, individuals could make bets on the outcomes of these events without violating anti-gambling laws.

Poker experts generally agree that poker is a game of skill. In evaluating writing the opinion in Pennsylvania v Dent, the judge wrote, "The compelling case that Texas Hold'em is much more a game of skill is found in many diverse source."

The economists Potter van Loon, Van den Assem and Van Dolder analyzed a large database with hundreds of millions of online player-hand observations. They found that players whose earlier profitability was in the top (bottom) deciles performed better (worse) and were substantially more likely to end up in the top (bottom) performance deciles of the following time period. Regression analyses reinforced this evidence for persistence and predictability. Their simulations pointed out that skill dominates chance when performance is measured over 1,500 or more hands of play. At a rate of 60-80 hands per hour per table, this means that the game is effectively a game of skill after about 19–25 hours of play for people who play one table at a time, and after even less hours for players playing at multiple tables.

Sean McCulloch, an associate professor of Mathematics and Computer Science at Ohio Wesleyan University, conducted a study on over 103 million hands played on PokerStars. In his study, he discovered that over 75% of the hands were determined without a showdown. In other words, that the victor was determined not based upon the cards in their hand, but rather the way the players played their hands.

== Key court cases ==
=== Baxter v. United States ===
William E. Baxter Jr. v. United States was a federal tax refund case, decided in 1986, regarding the U.S. federal income tax treatment of the gambling income of a professional gambler. Because of this case, gambling winnings in the United States can in certain cases be treated as earned income for federal income tax purposes. This means that in some cases expenses and losses can be deducted from gambling winnings in arriving at the net earnings from self-employment, and that winnings can be placed into retirement funds.

The Nevada judge who heard the case ruled in favor of Baxter, declaring "I find the government's argument to be ludicrous. I just wish you had some money and could sit down with Mr. Baxter and play some poker."

The court stated:

[T]he Court finds that capital was not a material [sic]-income-producing factor in Baxter's gaming income. In fact, the Court finds that Baxter's income was derived entirely from his personal services and that the capital he used to finance his poker playing was merely a "tool of the trade." The money, once bet, would have produced no income without the application of Baxter's skills. [ . . . ] it was Baxter's extraordinary poker skills which generated his substantial gaming income, not the intrinsic value of the money he bet.

The trial court ruled in favor of Baxter's claims for tax refunds.

=== Commonwealth of Pennsylvania vs Walter Watkins ===
Commonwealth of Pennsylvania vs Walter Watkins was a Pennsylvania court case wherein County Court ruled that poker was a game of skill not luck, thus not illegal gambling per the state statutes.

In December 2008, Walter Watkins and Diane Dent were charged with 20 counts of violating state statutes against gambling. Pennsylvania law alleged that the defendants "unlawfully allowed persons to collect and assemble for the purpose of unlawful gambling" and "unlawfully solicit or invite any person to visit any unlawful gambling place for the purpose of gambling." Walter Watkins was hosting poker games in his garage, and Diane Dent was serving the role of dealer. The house did not take rake, but players were expected to tip the dealer. The operation was infiltrated by an undercover police officer, who testified at the trial.

Both the state and the defense attorneys agreed to the principal facts in the case, but agreed that the "controlling issue" was whether or not Texas hold 'em is illegal gambling under the state's criminal code. In his opinion, Judge Thomas A. James Jr. determined that the question was if Texas hold 'em is a "game of skill or a game of chance... if chance predominates Texas hold 'em is gambling. If skill predominates, it is not gambling."

In writing his opinion, Justice Thomas James, Jr. cited a law review article whose authors wrote, "If you ask who are the top five poker players in the world, you will receive a meaningful response because skill is a determining factor. But if you ask who are the top five roulette players in the world, the response is utterly meaningless: roulette is purely a game of chance... The collective expert opinion is unequivocal: poker is a game of skill, and in the long run, a skilled player will beat an unskilled player... Poker is the one and only [card] game where a skilled player may hold bad cards for hours and still win the money."

This case was reversed on appeal to the Pennsylvania Superior Court, where it was held that poker is a game of chance and illegal under Pennsylvania law. Com. v. Dent, 922 A.2d 190 (Pa. Super. Ct. 2010).

=== Town of Mt. Pleasant v. Chimento ===
According to South Carolina law, it is a misdemeanor to play cards or dice in many locations, including a person's house. As gambling generally involves three elements: Prize, consideration and chance, the defense placed a great deal of testimony that poker was a game of skill. In issuing their verdict, the South Carolina Circuit Court wrote, “This Court…finds that Texas Hold‐em is a game of skill. The evidence and studies are overwhelming that this is so." The judge, however found the defendants guilty because the defense failed to show that South Carolina's legislative or judicial system accepted the Dominant Factor Test as normative in the state. "[T]his Court," the judge wrote, "will not set itself to definitively conclude that this State will or does follow the ‘Dominant Test’ Theory."

The South Carolina Supreme Court, however, reversed this decision in 2012, holding that "[w]hether an activity is gaming/gambling is not dependent upon the relative roles of chance and skill, but whether there is money or something of value wagered on the game's outcome."

=== Colorado v. Raley ===
Raley started a poker league in Greeley, Colorado, wherein players paid $20 to compete in a tournament. The league kept 10% of the buy-in to pay dealers and cover other expenses and paid the remainder of the money as prizes to the participants. In the case, the defense presented two arguments. First, they argued that each of the players had a "bona fide social relationship because only an existing member could introduce people he knew to join the league", thus qualified for an exception under Colorado law. Second, they argued that poker was a game of skill. Their expert witness, University of Denver's Robert Hannum, provided a study wherein 97% of the time a skilled player beat a computer simulation that played randomly. The jury did not indicate why they returned a verdict of not-guilty.

The state of Colorado has declared that they intend to appeal the judges permitting Hannum's testimony that poker is a game of skill. In a 1989 declaratory judgment, the Colorado Supreme Court ruled:

The final element of the statutory definition of "gambling" is that the risk associated with a valuable item for profit is wholly or partly dependent on a lot, chance, or event that the risk-taker cannot control. It is not disputed here that card games and other gambling at the Gala were wholly or partly dependent on the party or chance, and on an event or outcome of an event over which the risk-taker had no control. While poker and perhaps some of the wagering games may require skill, these games definitely depend "in part" on chance, and when, as here, games involve risking something valuable to make a profit, they represent is a form of "gambling". “In the generally accepted sense of the word. [2]

The state thus contends that Colorado does not accept the Dominant Factor Test. Proponents of the Dominant Factor Test argue that this ruling is too vague as virtually every game/competition involves some chance.

== DiCristina opinion ==
In 2012, federal circuit judge Jack Weinstein wrote a 120-page opinion concluding that poker is predominantly a game of skill. While overturned based on NY State law, the opinion still stands and included amicus briefs filed by third parties, including the Poker Player's Alliance. https://egr.global/intel/opinion/opinion_the_meaning_of_united_states_v-_dicristina/

== Legal ramifications ==
In his opinion, Judge James cited another legal expert who concluded, "If the federal courts proceed to classify poker as a skill game, then the Safe Port Act would not apply. Based on the verbiage of the definition of wager poker would once again be freely playable on the Internet."
