= 1896–97 National Association Foot Ball League season =

National Association Foot Ball League
- Season: 1896–97

Statistics of National Association Foot Ball League in season 1896–97.

== League standings ==
Position	Team	Pts	Pld	W	L	T	Remarks
	Bayonne Centreville						
	Scottish-Americans of Newark						
	Brooklyn Wanderers						
	Newark Caledonians						

== See also ==
- 1897 American Cup
