= 1894–95 in American soccer =

Soccer in the United States
- Season: 1894-95

The following article lists notable events during the 1894–95 season in American soccer.

== Leagues ==
=== ALPF ===
Organized by franchise owners of the National League of Professional Baseball Clubs, the ALFP played its only season this year.

Place	Team	GP	W	L	T	GF	GA	Points
1	Brooklyn Bridegrooms	6	5	1	0	20	6	10
2	Baltimore Orioles	4	4	0	0	24	3	8
3	Boston Beaneaters	5	4	1	0	15	12	8
4	New York Giants	6	2	4	0	16	13	4
5	Philadelphia Phillies	9	2	7	0	15	37	4
6	Washington Senators	6	1	5	0	7	26	2

== American Cup ==
=== 1893–94 American Cup ===
- Winner: Fall River Olympics
- Finalist: Paterson True Blues

=== 1894–95 American Cup ===
- Winner: Newark Caledonian
- Finalist: Pawtucket Free Wanderers
