= 1895–96 National Association Foot Ball League season =

National Association Foot Ball League
- Season: 1895–96
- Dates: Dec. 15, 1895 - April 26, 1896
- Champion: Scottish–Americans

The National Association Foot Ball League, which had played its first season in the spring of 1895, re-organized for the winter. The league opened its 1895—96 season on December 15, 1895, with five teams scheduled to play an 18 game schedule until the season's end on April 26, 1896. In addition to 1895 champion Centreville A.C. of Bayonne, New Jersey, the runner up Brooklyn Wanderers and the reorganized Scottish-Americans of Newark, two new teams joined, the New York Thistles and International A.C. of Paterson, New Jersey (which played its games at the grounds at (Communipaw). For the second season, the NAFBL mandated that the goals have nets in all league matches, and adopting the penalty kick rule. A schedule was issued in November. By the time league play started, however, the Brooklyn Wanderers had withdrawn, leaving only four teams.

The season ended early and the Scottish-Americans claimed the championship of the league after beating Centreville A.C. on April 5, 1896.

== Regular season ==
While the New York Sun and the New York Times reported early results, press coverage of the league ended after January. Results of league games were

December 15: Scottish-Americans 1, Internationals 1 (Paterson); Centreville 4, New York Thistles 2 (Bayonne)

December 22: Centreville 3, Internationals 2 (Bayonne); Scottish-Americans 7, Thistles 1 (Newark)

December 29: Scottish-Americans 7, Centreville 0 (Newark); Internationals 7, Thistles 1 (Paterson)

January 5: Internationals 3, Centreville 0 (Paterson)

January 19: Scottish-Americans 3, Internationals 3 (Newark). The game was marred by a serious injury to one of the players, Findley, a left wing for the Scottish-Americans

January 26: Scottish-Americans 12, Thistles 1 (Newark); Centreville 2, Internationals 1 (Paterson);

League play then halted, with the Scottish-Americans in first place (at 3 wins and 2 draws); followed by International (2 wins, 2 draws and 1 loss); Centreville (2 wins and 2 losses), and the New York Thistles, who lost all four games. The following Sunday, on February 2, an all-star benefit game for Findley was played before 1,500 spectators at by teams composed of seven of Findley's Scottish-Americans teammates (Wildt, Wilson, Cutler, McDonald, Singleton, McCullouch and Gaffney) and other locals against players for the other NAFBL teams, Centreville (Smith, Winter, Buell, Spaven and Oliver), the Internationals (Taylor, Flynn and O'Donnell), and the Thistles (T. Hopkins). As "The Jerseymen", the Scottish-Americans beat the "New Yorkers", 2 goals to 0.
