= Pennsylvania Sports Hall of Fame =

The Pennsylvania Sports Hall of Fame (PSHF) is a nonprofit organization established in 1962. It is the only community-based hall of fame in the United States. At its annual convention and induction ceremonial, the PSHF inducts athletes, coaches, administrators, and those involved in sports medicine and the sports media, whose athletic achievements "have brought lasting fame and recognition to the State of Pennsylvania". At the induction ceremony, ten living and two deceased inductees are honored, with the presentation of a Gold Inductee medallion with pendant. The convention and ceremonial are rotated among the chapters of the Central, Eastern, Northern, and Western regions.

The first induction ceremony was in 1963.

The first Ceremonial Dinner was held in 1963, in Philadelphia; the second was in 1964, at the Pittsburgh William Penn Hotel.

The Western Region hosted the 50th Anniversary Dinner on November 11, 2012, at the Sheraton Four Points in Warrendale.

== Regional chapters ==
The PSHF has twenty-eight chartered chapters, which serve over 300 communities in the state. The chapters are divided into four regions: Central, Eastern, Northern, and Western.

The Central Region's nine chapters are: Berks County, Capital, Central, Clinton County, Huntingdon, South Central, Susquehanna Valley, West Branch, and West Shore.

The Eastern Region's six chapters are: Bucks County, City All Star (Philadelphia), Delaware County, Montgomery County, Summit, and Tri-County.

The Northern Region's seven chapters are: Allen Rogowicz, Bernie Romanoski, Carbon County, Ed Romance, Luzerne-John Popple, Northeastern, and Northern Anthracite.

The Western Region's six chapters are: East Boros, Erie County, Fayette County, Mid Mon Valley, Washington-Greene County, and Western.

== Nominations ==
Each year, each chapter may nominate the names of no more than three living persons and two deceased persons, for consideration as possible inductees.

== Induction ceremonies ==
The 2016 induction ceremony will be hosted by the Erie County Chapter on Saturday, October 22, 2016, at the Erie Bayfront Convention Center.

== Inductees ==
See footnote

=== Baseball ===
See footnote

- 1963: John Lobert
- 1963: Connie Mack
- 1963: Stan Musial
- 1963: Jim Thorpe
- 1963: Harold "Pie" Traynor
- 1965: Roy Campanella
- 1965: Jimmy Dykes
- 1965: Jimmy Foxx
- 1965: Robert (Lefty) Grove
- 1965: Christy Mathewson
- 1966: Lester Bell
- 1966: Charles Gelbert
- 1966: Robin Roberts
- 1967: Charles Kelchner
- 1968: George (Whitey) Kurowski
- 1968: Bill McKechnie
- 1968: Curt Simmons
- 1968: Lloyd Waner
- 1969: Robert Friend
- 1969: Dick Groat
- 1970: Elroy Face
- 1970: Ralph Kiner
- 1970: Josh Gibson
- 1971: Stanley Coveleskie
- 1971: William Cox
- 1971: Nellie Fox
- 1971: Herb Pennock
- 1971: William Walters
- 1971: Lewis Wilson
- 1972: Richie Ashburn
- 1972: Frank Gustine
- 1972: Eddie Plank
- 1972: Ken Raffensberger
- 1973: Roberto Clemente
- 1973: Bing Miller
- 1973: John Ogden
- 1973: Truett (Rip) Sewell
- 1975: Eddie Collins, Sr.
- 1975: Del Ennis
- 1975: William Myers
- 1975: Cum Posey
- 1975: Tommy Richardson
- 1976: Frederick Frankhouse
- 1976: Charles "Chick" Fullis
- 1976: Carl Furillo
- 1977: Theodore Page
- 1977: James T. Sheckard
- 1977: William H. Sherdel
- 1977: Vic Wertz
- 1978: Danny Murtaugh
- 1978: Bobby Shantz
- 1978: Pete Suder
- 1978: James (Mickey) Vernon
- 1979: Joe Boley
- 1979: Gerald Lynch
- 1979: Sam McDowell
- 1979: Robert Purkey
- 1979: Charles T (Broadway) Wagner
- 1980: George Earnshaw
- 1980: Dick Gernert
- 1980: Don R. Wert
- 1981: Howard Bedell
- 1981: Randall Gumpert
- 1981: Ralph B. Melix
- 1981: George W. Staller
- 1982: James B, DeShong
- 1983: Joseph Holden
- 1983: Dave Ricketts
- 1983: Jimmy Ripple
- 1984: James Clarkson
- 1984: Thomas Ferrick
- 1984: Elmer Valo
- 1985: Billy Hunter
- 1985: Bill Mazeroski
- 1986: John P. Quinn
- 1986: Eddie Sawyer
- 1987: Al Brancato
- 1988: Stan Lopata
- 1988: Art Mahaffey
- 1989: Albert (Sparky) Lyle
- 1990: Earl (Sparky) Adams
- 1990: Steve Blass
- 1991: Eugene Benson
- 1992: Gene Garber
- 1992: John E Murphy
- 1992: Al (Scoop) Oliver
- 1993: Stephen F. O'Neil
- 1993: Chuck Tanner
- 1994: Nelson (Nellie) Briles
- 1995: Robert A. McDonnell
- 1996: Richard (Dick) Allen
- 1996: Nathan (Ed) Ott
- 1996: Manuel (Manny) Sanguillén
- 1997: Thomas M. Herr
- 1997: Richard Tracewski
- 2000: Hugh Jennings
- 2000: Kent Tekulve
- 2000: Bill Virdon
- 2002: Jean Marlowe
- 2002: Tom O'Malley
- 2002: Ed Walsh
- 2002: Bob Williams
- 2003: Steve Bilko
- 2003: Lee Elia
- 2003: Joseph Page
- 2003: Robert Walk
- 2004: George (Ken) Griffey, Sr.
- 2004: Mark Gubicza
- 2005: Greg Gross
- 2005: Stanley (Bucky) Harris
- 2006: Jim W. Russell
- 2007: Joe Glenn
- 2008: Walter Harris
- 2008: Pete Vukovich
- 2012: Nellie King
- 2012: Jeff Manto
- 2012: Jim Leyland
- 2014: Harry Kalas
- 2014: Ron Necciai
- 2014: Lance Rautzhan

=== Football ===
?
See footnote

== See also ==
- Philadelphia Sports Hall of Fame
- Sports in Pennsylvania
