= Commonwealth v. Dent =

- Court: Superior Court of Pennsylvania
- Full case name: Commonwealth of Pennsylvania v. Diane Alice Dent, Walter Watkins
- Citations: 2010 PA Super 47; 992 A.2d 190

Case history
- Appealed from: Columbia County Court of Common Pleas

Court membership
- Judges sitting: Kate Ford Elliott, Robert A. Freedberg, Robert E. Colville

Case opinions
- Decision by: Freedberg
- Dissent: Colvill

Commonwealth v. Dent, 2010 PA Super 47, 992 A.2d 190 (2010), was a Pennsylvania court case wherein a Columbia County Court ruled that poker was a game of skill not luck, thus not illegal gambling per the state statutes. Later, On April 2, 2010, a Pennsylvania Superior Court overturned the ruling declaring poker to be a game of luck.

== Trial ==
In December 2008, Walter Watkins and Diane Dent were charged with 20 counts of violating state statutes against gambling. Pennsylvania law alleged that the defendants "unlawfully allowed persons to collect and assemble for the purpose of unlawful gambling" and "unlawfully solicit or invite any person to visit any unlawful gambling place for the purpose of gambling." Walter Watkins was hosting poker games in his garage, and Diane Dent was serving the role of dealer. The house did not take rake, but players were expected to tip the dealer. The operation was infiltrated by an undercover police officer, who testified at the trial.

Both the state and the defense attorneys agreed to the principal facts in the case, but agreed that the "controlling issue" was whether or not Texas hold 'em is illegal gambling under the state's criminal code. In his opinion, Judge Thomas A. James Jr. determined that the question was if Texas hold 'em is a "game of skill or a game of chance... if chance predominates Texas hold 'em is gambling. If skill predominates, it is not gambling." This interpretation comes from a 1983 state Supreme Court ruling, which said “for a game to constitute gambling, it must be a game where chanced predominates rather than skill.”

In evaluating the case, James discussed the "Dominant Factor Test" that most jurisdictions use in cases dealing with what is and is not gambling. The Dominant Factor Test relies upon four criteria:

1. Participants must have a distinct possibility of exercising skill and must have sufficient data upon which to calculate an informed judgment.
2. Participants must have the opportunity to exercise the skill, and the general class of participants must possess the skill.
3. Skill or the competitors efforts must sufficiently govern the results
4. The standard of skill must be known to the participants, and this standard must govern the results.

In reaching his conclusion, the judge said that there are over 600 books on the subject of poker strategy and that all agree that poker is a game of skill. He quoted Mike Caro's book Secrets of Winning Poker "money flows from the bad players to the good players." He also cited "a number of mathematical studies that link 'poker and economics.'" One study in particular showed that "Beginning poker players rely on big hands and lucky draws. Expert poker players use their skill to minimize their losses on their bad hands and maximize their profits on their big hands."

James cited a 2005 study In Poker: Public Policy, Law, Mathematics, and the Future of American Tradition. The study compared the results of black jack, roulette, poker, and other forms of gambling. "If you ask who are the top five poker players in the world, you will receive a meaningful response because skill is a determining factor. But if you ask who are the top five roulette players in the world, the response is utterly meaningless: roulette is purely a game of chance... The collective expert opinion is unequivocal: poker is a game of skill, and in the long run, a skilled player will beat an unskilled player... Poker is the one and only [card] game where a skilled player may hold bad cards for hours and still win the money."

Poker Player Alliance Executive Director John Pappas hails the decision as a key victory in legalizing online poker. Since the ruling, speculation has emerged on the web that online poker sites might take the US to court to overturn the Unlawful Internet Gambling Enforcement Act prohibition against online poker. The United States has, however, in previous litigation shown a preference to pay fines when countries sue it for trade restrictions than reverse the UIGEA.

== Ruling overturned ==
The state appealed the verdict and on April 10, 2010, the state's appellate court ruled 2-1 that the game is a game dominated by luck. The appellate court relied primarily upon older rulings from states with a less defined Dominant Factor Test. In his dissenting opinion, Judge Robert Colville did not declare poker to be a game of skill, but instead said that the Commonwealth failed to prove that poker was a game of chance.

The state opted not to attempt a retrial, offering community service to both Walter Watkins and Diane Dent and a full expunging of the record. Both did 20 hours of community service.
