= Centreville A.C. =

- Full name: Centreville Athletic Club
- Founded: 1895
- Dissolved: 1899
- League: National Association Football League

Centreville Athletic Club (Centerville A.C.) of Bayonne, New Jersey was a U.S. soccer team which competed in the National Association Football League, winning two championships.

== History ==
In April 1895, the Centreville A.C. joined the newly establish National Association Football League (NAFBL), a professional soccer league encompassing northern New Jersey and New York City. The team had been in existence previously as a recreational club. The first season in the NAFBL went well for Centreville as it took the title. However, the records for the league's second season have not been fully reconstructed and the final standings are unknown. Centreville earned their second championship in the 1896–97 season. The onset of a major recession combined with the Spanish–American War led to a suspension of the league in 1899.

== Year-by-year ==
Year	League	Reg. season	American Cup
1893–94			First Round
1895	NAFBL	1st	First Round
1895/96	NAFBL	?	DNE
1896/97	NAFBL	1st	DNE
1897/98	NAFBL	4th	DNE
1898/99	NAFBL	DNF (Note: League folded before season completed)	DNE

== Honors ==
League Championship

- Winner (2): 1895, 1897
