= Baltimore Orioles F.C. =

Association football club

Baltimore Orioles F.C. were a soccer club based in Baltimore, Maryland. The club was formed in 1893 and in 1895 the club folded. They were sponsored by the early professional baseball circuit, the National League with their 19th Century Baltimore Orioles baseball club, who were then famous for winning three League championships in a row: 1894, 1895, and 1896. The "Orioles" soccer/football club played in the short-lived league of the American League of Professional Football. Baltimore did not finish the season due to accusation of using international players who were in the country illegally. At the time they folded, Baltimore was undefeated.
