= 1895 National Association Foot Ball League season =

National Association Foot Ball League
- Season: 1895
- Dates: May 4 - June 16
- Champion(s): Bayonne Centreville (1st title)
- Matches: 22
- Goals: 135 (6.14 per match)

The National Association Foot Ball League, organized on January 8, 1895 played its first season in the spring of 1895, with four teams playing Sunday afternoon games. In the league opener on March 3, 1895, Centreville A.C. of Bayonne, New Jersey visited the Brooklyn Wanderers on the grounds of the Varuna Boat Club in South Brooklyn, and won, 5 to 2.

== League standings ==
Position	Team	Pts	Pld	W	L	T	Remarks
1	Bayonne Centreville	20	12	9	1	2	
2	Scottish-Americans of Newark	13	11	6	4	1	
3	Brooklyn Wanderers	11	12	5	6	1	
4	Americus A. A. (W. Hoboken)	5	10	2	7	1	
--	New Rochelle FC	--	--	--	--	--	Did not start

According to a contemporary newspaper account at season's end, with forfeited games included in the standings, the final results for 13 scheduled games were:

- Centreville A.C. 11 wins, 1 loss, 1 draw (23 points); Goals Scored 53, Goals Allowed 21
- Brooklyn Wanderers 5 wins, 6 loss, 1 draw (12 points); Goals Scored 39, Goals Allowed 43
- Scottish-Americans 5 wins, 6 loss, 1 draw (12 points); Goals Scored 29, Goals Allowed 28
- Americus A.A. 4 wins, 8 losses, 1 draw (9 points); Goals Scored 14, Goals Allowed 43.

The Scottish-Americans team had disbanded before the end of the season and second place (and a silver medal) was awarded to the Wanderers.

== See also ==
- ALPF
