= Eastern Basketball Alliance =

Defunct American basketball league

- Eastern Basketball Alliance logo
- Sport: Basketball
- Founded: 1996
- Folded: 2015
- No. of teams: 9
- Country: USA
- Last champion: Harrisburg Horizon (2015)
- Most titles: Harrisburg Horizon (9)
- Website: Official site

The Eastern Basketball Alliance was a semi-professional men's winter basketball league. Games were played on the weekends and the season was approximately four months long (January through April).

== History ==
The EBA was formed in 1996 from the fledgling Atlantic Basketball Association. The league played its first season with seven teams. In 1997, the league expanded to ten teams and was incorporated. In 1998, the first EBA commissioner was elected.

From 1999 to 2001, the EBA joined with four ABA teams to form the United Basketball Alliance, but in 2002 they returned to being the EBA.

The EBA took a one-year (2015-16 season) hiatus. The league never returned.

== Teams ==
=== Teams (2016) ===
Division	Team	City	Arena
Northern
Northern	Columbia All-Stars	Columbia, Maryland	
Northern	Harrisburg Horizon	Harrisburg, Pennsylvania	Rowland Academy
Northern	Schuylkill Firedogs	Philadelphia, Pennsylvania	Simon Kramer Community and Recreation Center
Northern	Western Maryland Elite	Hagerstown, Maryland	Martin Luther King Jr. Center
Northern	York Mighty Ants	York, Pennsylvania	New Hope Academy
Travel/Southern teams	DMV Kings	Baltimore, Maryland	
Travel/Southern teams	Marietta Tarantulas	Marietta, Georgia	
Travel/Southern teams	MetroWest Ballas	MetroWest, Massachusetts	
Travel/Southern teams	Maryland Bayraiders	Gwynn Oak, Maryland	
Travel/Southern teams	Silver Spring Barracudas	Silver Spring, Maryland	

=== Former teams ===
- Bad News Ballers
- Beltway Bombers
- Carolina Gladiators
- Diamond City Playaz
- Elmira Bulldogs
- Garden State Rebels
- Hudson Valley Hype
- Lancaster Storm
- Maryland Marvels
- Mercer Marauders
- Metropolitan All-Stars
- Morris Revolution
- New Jersey Bullets
- New York City Jaguars
- New York Wizards
- North Jersey Lakers
- Portsmouth Cavaliers
- Scranton Blast
- South Jersey Enterprise
- Springfield Slamm
- The Destroyers
- Tru Hope Trailblazers
- Virginia Wolverines
- Washington Americans
- Washington Madness
- Washington Warriors
- Westchester Dutchmen

== Champions ==
Season	Champion	Runner-up	Result
1997	Scranton Blast		
1998	Springfield Slamm		
1999	Lancaster Storm		
2000	Morris Revolution		
2001	Morris Revolution	New Philadelphia Firedogs	90-80
2002	Harrisburg Horizon	New Philadelphia Firedogs	2-0 (best-of 3)
2003	Harrisburg Horizon	no playoffs	
2004	Harrisburg Horizon	no playoffs	
2005	Harrisburg Horizon & Delaware Destroyers	no playoffs	
2006	Harrisburg Horizon	Delaware Destroyers	
2007	Harrisburg Horizon & Delaware Destroyers	no playoffs	
2008	Harrisburg Horizon	North Jersey Lakers	98-96
2009	Delaware Destroyers	Elmira Bulldogs	115-103
2010	Delaware Destroyers	Tru Hope Trailblazers	114-97
2011	Metropolitan All-Stars	Maryland Marvels	118-98
2012	Hudson Valley Hype	Metropolitan All-Stars	103-92
2013	New York Wizards	Harrisburg Horizon	118-116
2014	Harrisburg Horizon	York Mighty Ants	101-92
2015	Harrisburg Horizon	York Mighty Ants	93-85

== See also ==
- List of developmental and minor sports leagues
