= American League of Professional Football =

First professional soccer league in the United States

- Founded: 1894
- Folded: October 20, 1894; 130 years ago
- Country: United States
- Number of clubs: 6
- Level on pyramid: 1
- Promotion to: None
- Relegation to: None
- Last champions: Brooklyn Bridegrooms (1894)

American League of Professional Football was the first professional soccer league in the United States, existing for one season in 1894. It was also one of the earliest professional leagues in the world. It was created by the owners of the National League of Professional Baseball Clubs, partly to fill their dormant stadiums in the winter months and partly for publicity reasons to keep their baseball seasons visible to the public during the off-season.

== History ==
Philadelphia Phillies manager Arthur Irwin organized and served as manager of the league.

The 1894 schedule included six teams sponsored by National League teams that played a total of 23 games.

The league's inaugural game was played at Philadelphia Ball Park on October 6, 1894. 500 fans saw New York defeat Philadelphia 5 to 0.

Although the club owners encouraged attendance by setting ticket prices low, typically 25 cents, the turn out was light, averaging about 500 spectators. By comparison, average crowds in the National League that year ranged from as much as about 6,000 to as few as about 600. Baltimore Orioles F.C. regularly attracted crowds as large as 12,000, but only had a crowd of 500 in their last game. However, other club owners accused Baltimore of illegally employing British players, and U.S. immigration officials soon began to investigate the allegations.

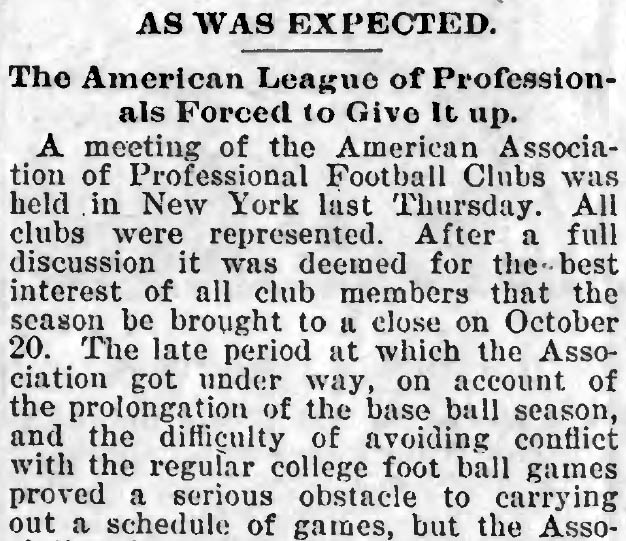
Demise of the ALPF, as covered on The Sporting Life, October 27, 1894

At the same time, with rumors circulating that a new baseball league was being formed, the club owners became convinced that the soccer league was a distraction from the serious business of possible competition from a new, rival league. This was combined with a move by the American Football Association to ban players from the ALPF from playing in the AFA. This came as the AFA saw the ALPF encroaching on its territory. The combination of these new competitive pressures and the ongoing immigration investigation scuppered the planned 1895 season and the League itself.

== League standings ==
Place	Team	GP	W	L	T	GF	GA	Points
1	Brooklyn Bridegrooms	6	5	1	0	20	6	10
2	Baltimore Orioles	4	4	0	0	24	3	8
3	Boston Beaneaters	5	4	1	0	15	12	8
4	New York Giants	6	2	4	0	16	13	4
5	Philadelphia Phillies	9	2	7	0	15	37	4
6	Washington Senators	6	1	5	0	7	26	2

== See also ==
- 1895 American Cup
- 1895 NAFBL
