= Harrisburg Horizon =

- Founded: 1998
- League: EBA (1998-2016)
- Team history: Harrisburg Horizon; 1997-2016
- Based in: Harrisburg, Pennsylvania
- Arena: Manny Weaver Gym
- Colors: green, orange
- Owner: Richard & Cynthia Anzolut
- Head coach: Daniel Joyner
- Championships: 9(2002, 2003, 2004, 2005, 2006, 2007, 2008, 2014,2015)
- Cheerleaders: Horizon Cheerleaders
- Dancers: The Revillettes
- Mascot: Revillee

The Harrisburg Horizon were a professional basketball team based in Harrisburg, Pennsylvania, in the United States. The Horizon were a member of the Eastern Basketball Alliance. From the 1998 season to 2015, the Horizon played their home games at Manny Weaver Gymnasium at Rowland Intermediate School. Their last home venue was Manny Weaver Gym at Rowland Middle School.

== Season-by-season records ==
Harrisburg Horizon - 1998 to 2007
Season	W - L Record	Win%	Playoffs
1998	9-7	56.25	2-1
1999	14-6	70.00	0-1
2000	13-1	92.86	1-1
2001	11-3	78.57	0-1
2002	11-0	100.00	2-0
2003	8-1	88.89	0-0
2004	8-1	88.89	0-0
2005	7-2	77.78	0-0
2006	9-0	100.00	0-0
2007	9-1	90.00	0-0
2008	8-2	80.00	0-0
Totals (1998-2008)	107-24	81.68	5-4
Playoffs
Playoff Series

- Eight EBA championships (2002, 2003, 2004, 2005, 2006, 2007, 2008, 2014)

== Lady Horizon ==
The Harrisburg Lady Horizon compete in the Women's Eastern Basketball Alliance (WEBA), winning three championships (2004, 2005, and 2006).
