= List of parks in Pittsburgh =

This is a list of parks in Pittsburgh. All public parkland in the City of Pittsburgh is maintained by the Pittsburgh Department of Parks & Recreation and the Department of Public Works. Addental support is provided by the nonprofit Pittsburgh Parks Conservancy. Some park are private and others are managed by the city's colleges and universities.

- Allegheny Arsenal
- Allegheny Commons
- Allegheny Riverfront Park
- ArtGardens of Pittsburgh
- Chatham University Arboretum
- Emerald View Park
- Dippy statue
- Flagstaff Hill, Pennsylvania
- Frank Curto Park
- Frick Park
- Highland Park
- Junction Hollow
- Mary Schenley Memorial Fountain
- McBride Park
- Mellon Green
- Mellon Park
- Mellon Square
- North Shore Riverfront Park
- Panther Hollow
- Panther Hollow Bridge
- Phillips Park
- Point of View
- Point of View Park
- Point State Park
- Riverview Park
- Roberto Clemente Memorial Park
- Rodef Shalom Biblical Botanical Garden
- Schenley Bridge
- Schenley Park
- Schenley Plaza
- Sheraden Park
- South Shore Riverfront Park
- South Side Park
- Stephen Foster
- Three Rivers Heritage Trail
- Three Rivers Park
- West End Overlook
- West End Park
- Westinghouse Park
