= North Shore Riverfront Park =

Park in Pittsburgh, Pennsylvania, United States

Coordinates: 40.44480°N 80.0127°W

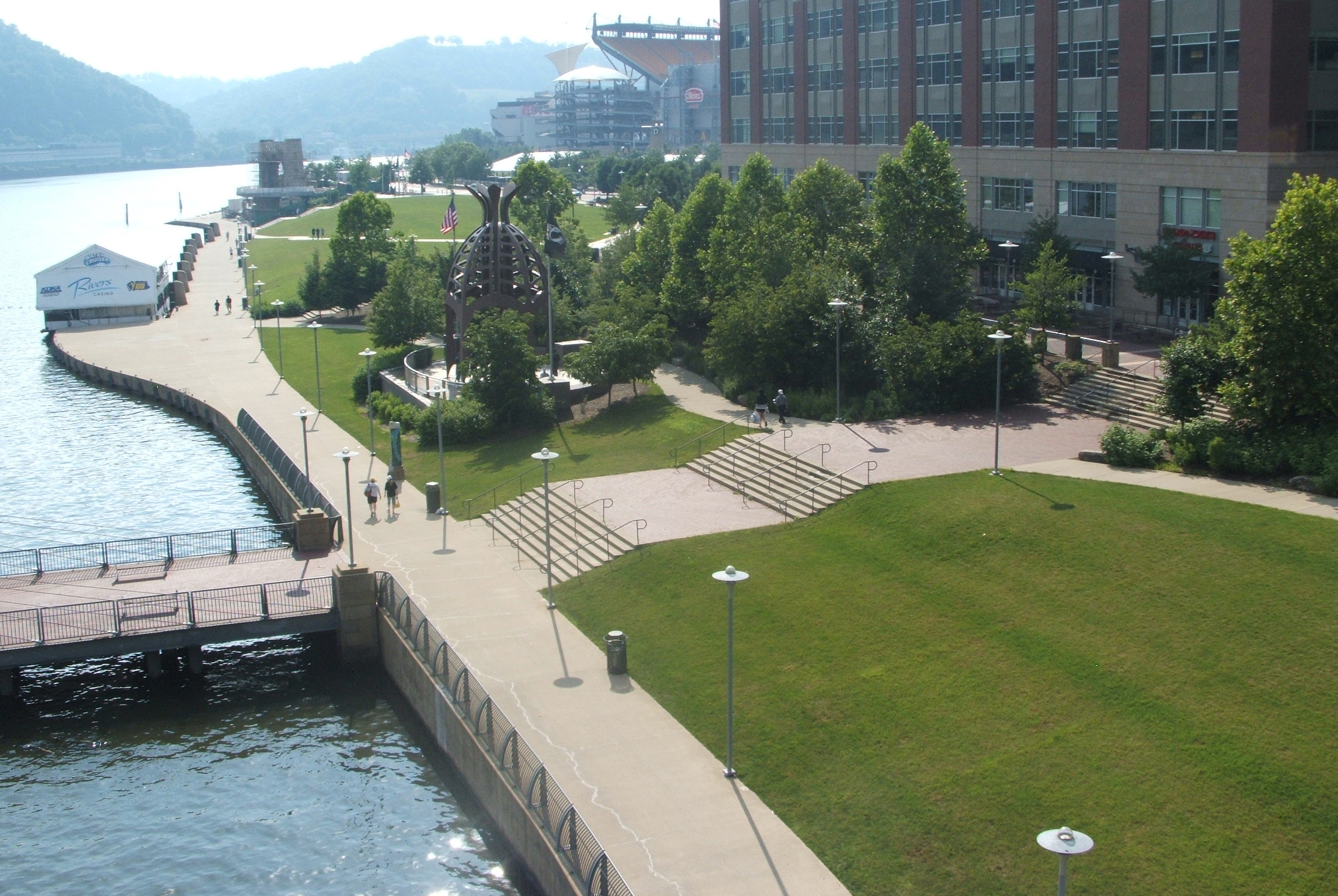
A portion of North Shore Riverfront Park; viewed from the Fort Duquesne Bridge

North Shore Riverfront Park is a small municipal park along the north banks of the Allegheny and Ohio Rivers across from Downtown Pittsburgh, Pennsylvania, United States.

== History and notable features ==
This municipal park is a parcel of Three Rivers Park, the city's urban waterfront park along its rivers that provides a continuous green trail link between existing and future riverfront destinations. Completed segments include South Shore Riverfront Park, Allegheny Riverfront Park, and Point State Park. It is owned jointly by the City of Pittsburgh and the Sports & Exhibition Authority of Pittsburgh and Allegheny County

Established in 2001, North Shore Riverfront Park stretches about one mile (1.6 km) between the Kamin Science Center and the Three Sisters bridges—Roberto Clemente Bridge, Andy Warhol Bridge, and Rachel Carson Bridge. The park, which also skirts Heinz Field and PNC Park, offers walking and biking trails with unobstructed vistas of the cityscape.

The park is designed with both a riverwall and riverwalk, which create a trail along the water's edge. Boat tie-ups are located along the park to encourage water recreation. In front of each stadium is a large cobblestone quay that handles canoes and kayaks, as well as larger vessels that usually transport sports fans.

A second park level includes large open spaces of grass and native landscaping, crossed by paths running in a southwest direction, mimicking the river. The largest of these panels, called the Great Lawn, is approximately three acres of grass. An esplanade runs at the top level of the park and features a broad walkway.

Other features include Kayak Pittsburgh, the Water Steps (an interactive fountain), and the Market Street Pier. North Shore Riverfront Park also houses three memorials: the Korean War Veterans Memorial, the Vietnam Veterans Memorial, and the Law Enforcement Officers Memorial.

The park is a project of the Pittsburgh Sports & Exhibition Authority with help from the Riverlife Task Force.
