= Allegheny Riverfront Park =

Park in Pittsburgh, Pennsylvania

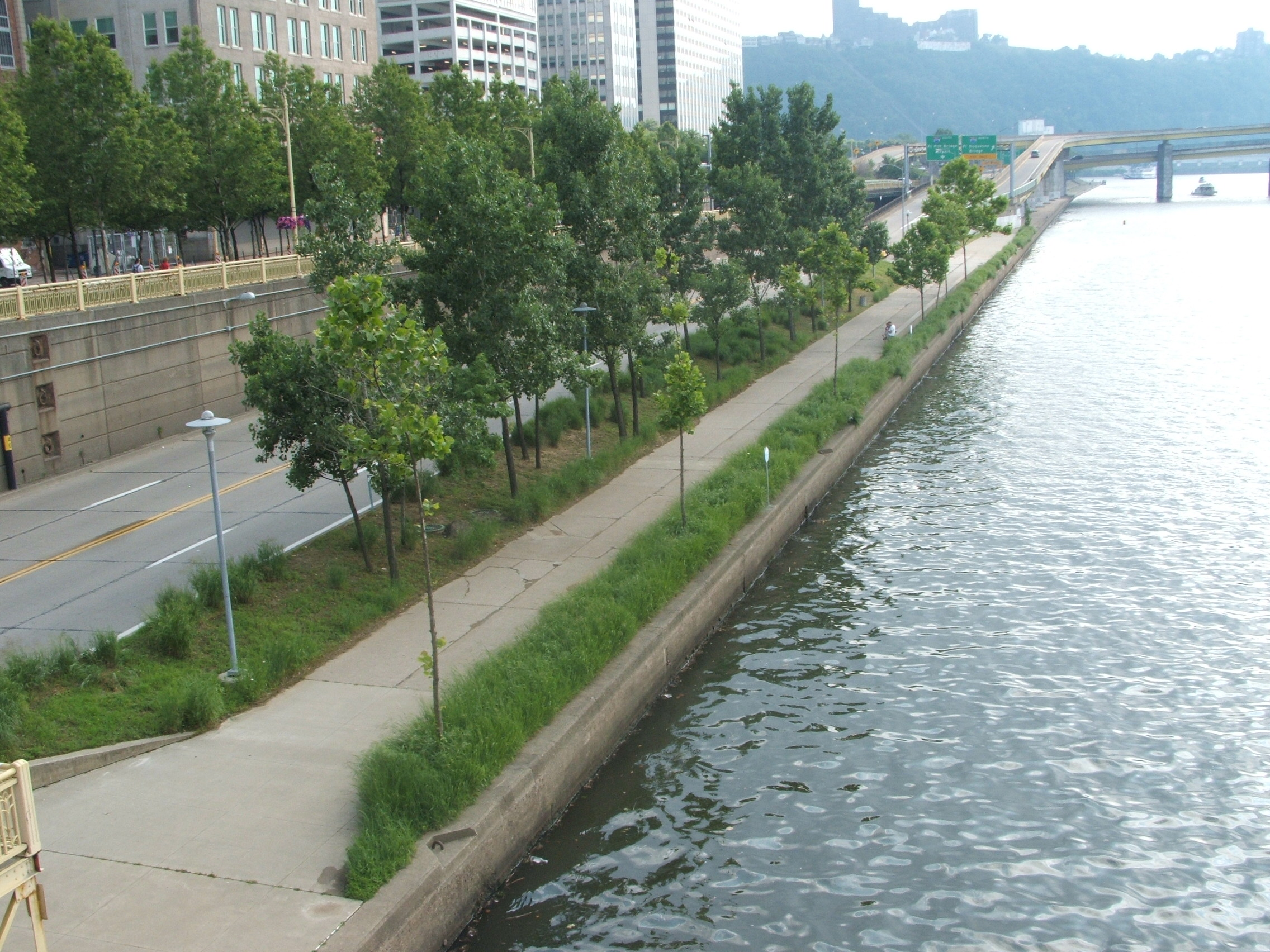
- Interactive map of Allegheny Riverfront Park
- Type: Municipal Park
- Location: South Shore, Allegheny River, Pittsburgh, Pennsylvania
- Coordinates: 40.443996°N 80.004662°W
- Created: 1998

Allegheny Riverfront Park is a municipal park that runs along the south bank of the Allegheny River in Downtown Pittsburgh.

It is a parcel of the Three Rivers Park, the city's grand urban waterfront park project along its rivers that will provide a continuous green trail connecting existing and future riverfront developments. Completed segments include North Shore Riverfront Park, South Shore Riverfront Park, and Point State Park.

The boundaries of the park are the Ninth Street Pier and Fort Duquesne Bridge. The park consists of two 4,000 foot promenades that run along the river on either side of the multilevel 10th Street Bypass and Fort Duquesne Boulevard above. The lower tier, which is at river level, opened in 1998, while the upper tier was completed in 2001. Each of the Three Sisters bridges—Roberto Clemente Bridge, Andy Warhol Bridge, and Rachel Carson Bridge— intersects with the park.

The idea of riverfront parks for downtown Pittsburgh dates back to 1911 and a plan prepared by the Olmsted Brothers. The proposal was revived in the early 1990s when the Pittsburgh Cultural Trust's District Plan called for a riverfront park to frame the Cultural District's northern boundary.

The Trust's Public Arts Advisory Committee commissioned a collaboration between artists Ann Hamilton, Michael Mercil, and landscape architect Michael Van Valkenburgh, who is a professor of landscape architecture at the Harvard Graduate School of Design, and his firm Michael Van Valkenburgh Associates (MVVA) to create the new park. According to Carol Brown, the head of the Pittsburgh Cultural Trust at the time, "the challenges of the site became the strengths of the final design of the park. Two parallel linear spaces dissected by highways, with vastly different elevations and periodic flooding, led MVVA, Hamilton, and Mercil to create an innovative, complex and highly successful design vocabulary for the park".

In 2002, Allegheny Riverfront Park received a Design Merit Award from the ASLA, and a Places/EDRA Place Design Award.
