= Roberto Clemente Park =

Roberto Clemente Park may refer to the following parks, all named for Roberto Clemente:

- Roberto Clemente Memorial Park, in Pittsburgh, Pennsylvania
- Roberto Clemente State Park in the Bronx, New York City
- Roberto Clemente Park, pool and playground in Trenton, New Jersey
- Roberto Clemente Park in New Bedford, Massachusetts
- Roberto Clemente Park in Paterson, New Jersey (formerly Sandy Hill Park)
- Roberto Clemente Park in Brentwood, New York
- Roberto Clemente Park in Miami, Florida's Wynwood neighborhood
- Roberto Clemente Park in Lowell, Massachusetts' Little Cambodia neighborhood
