= Point of View Park =

Parklet in Pittsburgh, Pennsylvania, US

Coordinates: 40.439256°N 80.021269°W

Point of View Park is an American parklet that is located in Pittsburgh, Pennsylvania.

== History and notable features ==
This parklet sits on the edge of Mount Washington (Grandview Avenue at Sweetbriar Street) on the westernmost end of Grand View Scenic Byway Park, of which it is a part, and the Grand View Scenic Byway, a designated Pennsylvania scenic byway.

The park is named for a landmark 2006 public sculpture in bronze by James A. West, Point of View. This piece depicts George Washington and the Seneca leader Guyasuta, with their weapons down, in a face-to-face meeting in October 1770, when the two men met while Washington was in the area examining land for future settlement along the Ohio River.

Before the dedication of the park in October 2006 by mayor Luke Ravenstahl, it had been known by locals as "Photography Park" because of its popularity with tourists who perched on the concrete overlook taking pictures of the cityscape below.
