= Point of View (West) =

Sculpture by JA West in Pennsylvania, US

Coordinates: 40.439256°N 80.021269°W

Point of View is a 2006 landmark public sculpture in bronze by James A. West which sits in a parklet named for the work of art, Point of View Park, in Pittsburgh, Pennsylvania, United States. The piece depicts George Washington and the Seneca leader Guyasuta, with their weapons down, in a face-to-face meeting in October 1770, when the two men met while Washington was in the area examining land for future settlement along the Ohio River.

== History and notable features ==
The work weighs 750 lbs. and cost $130,000 for materials with charitable donations of land, pedestal and artist time.

Point of View sits on the edge of Mount Washington (Grandview Avenue at Sweetbriar Street) on the westernmost end of Grand View Scenic Byway Park and the Grand View Scenic Byway, a designated Pennsylvania scenic byway.

The sculpture was dedicated on October 25, 2006, by mayor Luke Ravenstahl.

== See also ==
- List of statues of George Washington
- List of sculptures of presidents of the United States
