= Riverlife Task Force =

U.S. nonprofit organization

Riverlife (formerly known as Riverlife Task Force) is a nonprofit public-private partnership established in 2000 to guide and advocate for the redevelopment of the riverfronts of the City of Pittsburgh, Pennsylvania. Its most significant capital project is the planning and development of Three Rivers Park.

== Organization ==
=== History ===
Riverlife was established as Riverlife Task Force in 2000 as an independent public-private partnership, with its main focus being the creation of Three Rivers Park. Since its founding, Riverlife has been an active proponent of riverfront development focused towards bettering the beauty and recreational aspects of Pittsburgh's rivers. It has also voiced concerns over projects that it has felt would have an adverse effect on the rivers.

Over $129 million of public and private funding has been invested in building Pittsburgh's riverfront park system since 2000, resulting in over $4.1 billion in adjacent development in the forms of hotels, office buildings, entertainment venues and other real estate projects located next to the park.

Past and present board members of Riverlife include Carol Brown, former president of Pittsburgh Cultural Trust; Teresa Heinz of the Heinz Endowments; Paul O’Neill, former United States Secretary of the Treasury; Dan Onorato, Chief Executive of Allegheny County; and Art Rooney, Jr., president of the Pittsburgh Steelers.

The organization simplified its name from Riverlife Task Force to Riverlife in 2008.

Vivien Li is Riverlife's president and CEO.

=== Mission and goals ===
The core goal of Riverlife is to reclaim, restore and promote Pittsburgh's riverfronts as an environmental, recreational, cultural, and economic hub for the people of the region and its visitors. This is being accomplished through a combination of the following three approaches:

1. Developing core capital projects and acting as the driving force behind them.
2. Supporting other capital projects that are sponsored by public and private partners.
3. Advocating for high quality design, environmental preservation, and other issues that affect the park's development.

Riverlife has often been a distinct voice in the areas of Pittsburgh development projects. It has a history of both supporting or criticizing projects that it feels would have a positive or adverse effect on the rivers of Pittsburgh.
