= South Shore Riverfront Park =

Park in Pittsburgh, Pennsylvania, United States

Coordinates: 40.429151°N 79.964836°W

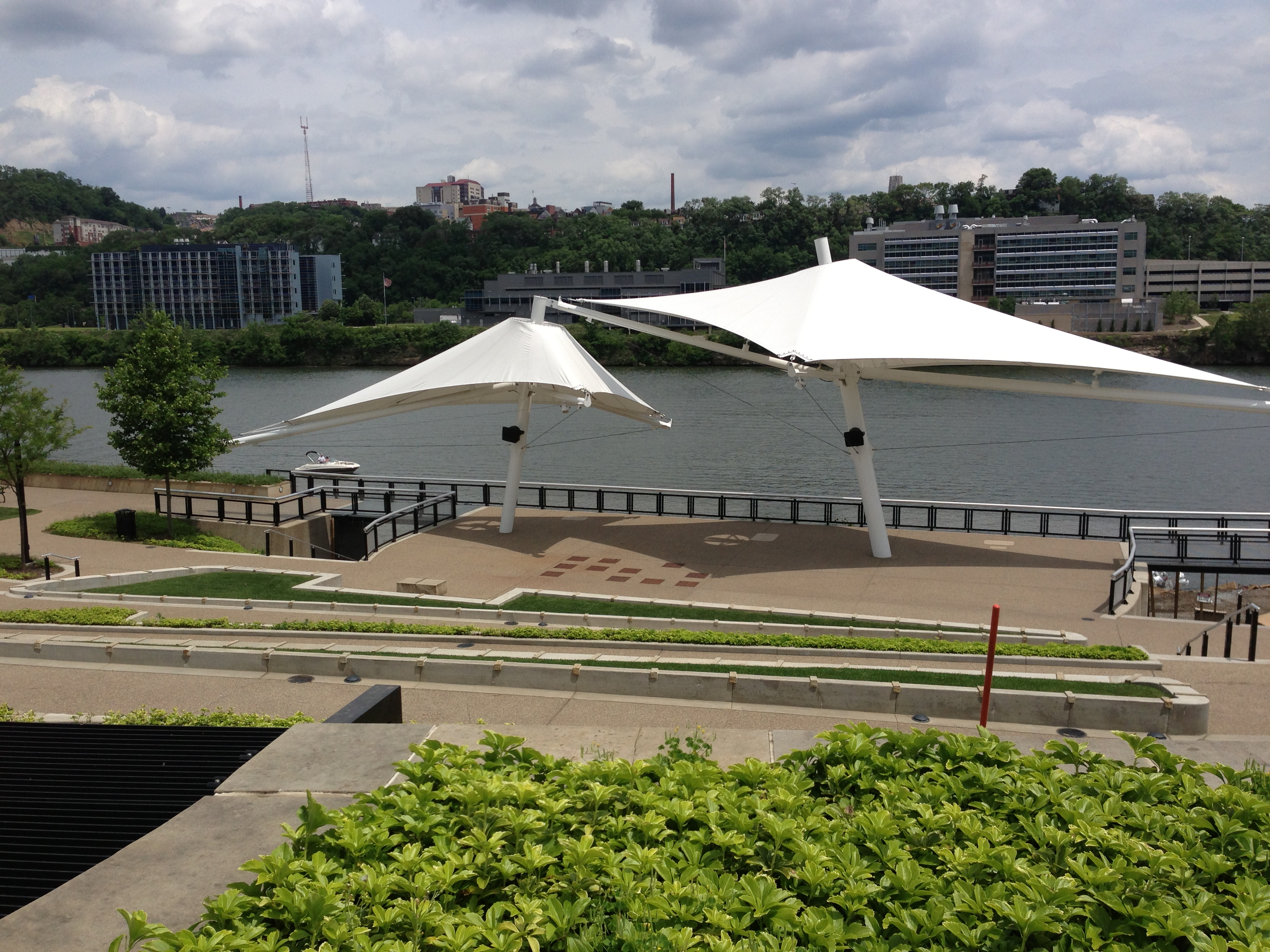
South Shore Riverfront Park

The South Shore Riverfront Park is a 3.4-acre park that stretches from 25th to 29th streets along the south banks of the Monongahela River upriver from Downtown Pittsburgh, Pennsylvania, United States. It is situated on the site of the former Jones & Laughlin Steel Mill and is adjacent to the SouthSide Works retail and residential complex.

== History and notable features ==
This American park opened to the public in May 2012. It is a parcel of Three Rivers Park, the city's urban waterfront park along its rivers that provides a continuous green trail link between existing and future riverfront destinations. Completed segments of Three Rivers Park include North Shore Riverfront Park, Allegheny Riverfront Park, and Point State Park. The Three Rivers Heritage Trail and Great Allegheny Passage run through South Shore Riverfront Park.

It is owned by the Urban Redevelopment Authority of Pittsburgh, with maintenance coordinated by The Soffer Organization and Riverlife.
