= Andy Warhol Bridge =

Bridge over the Allegheny River in Pittsburgh, Pennsylvania, US

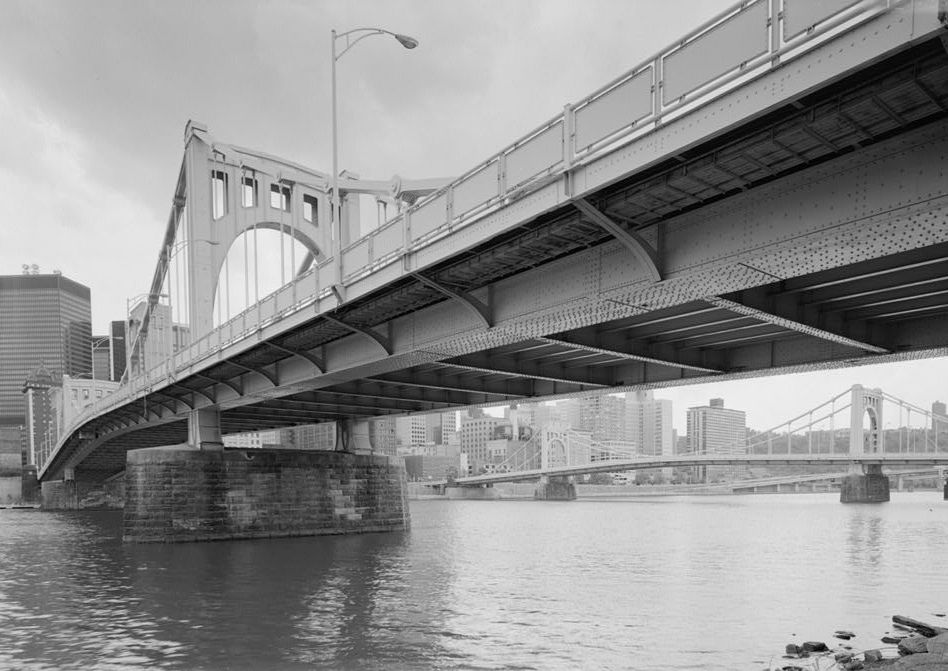
- From north bank of the Allegheny River, looking southwest, downtown Pittsburgh in background, Roberto Clemente Bridge at right. Shows main plate girder (bearing compressive forces) and sidewalk support.
- Coordinates: 40°26′46″N 80°00′05″W
- Carries: Seventh Street
- Crosses: Allegheny River
- Official name: Andy Warhol Bridge
- Named for: Andy Warhol
- Maintained by: Allegheny County

Characteristics
- Design: Suspension bridge
- Total length: 1,061 ft (323 m)
- Width: 62 ft (19 m) Vertical clearance above 78 ft towers
- Height: 83.5 ft (25.5 m)

History
- Constructed by: American Bridge Company
- Construction start: 1925
- Construction end: 1926
- Opened: June 17, 1926
- Andy Warhol Bridge
- U.S. National Register of Historic Places
- Pittsburgh Landmark – PHLF
- NRHP reference No.: 86000018

Significant dates
- Added to NRHP: January 7, 1986
- Designated PHLF: 1988

Location
- Interactive map of Andy Warhol Bridge

Andy Warhol Bridge, also known as the Seventh Street Bridge, spans the Allegheny River in Downtown Pittsburgh. It is the only bridge in the United States named for a visual artist. It was opened as the Seventh Street Bridge at a cost of $1.5 million on June 17, 1926, in a ceremony attended by 2,000 people.

== History and architectural features ==
Now named for the artist Andy Warhol, a Pittsburgh native, this structure is one of three parallel bridges called The Three Sisters, the others being the Roberto Clemente Bridge and the Rachel Carson Bridge. The Three Sisters are self-anchored suspension bridges and are historically significant because they are the only trio of nearly identical bridges — as well as the first self-anchored suspension spans — built in the United States.

The bridge was renamed for Warhol on March 18, 2005, as part of the tenth-anniversary celebration for the Andy Warhol Museum. The museum is nearby at 117 Sandusky Street, a street which leads to the bridge from the north side of the river on Pittsburgh's North Shore.

On August 11, 2013, the Andy Warhol Bridge was covered with 580 knitted and crocheted panels in a yarn bombing project known as Knit the Bridge that lasted for four weeks.

This is the third bridge on the site, the first having been demolished in early 1884. Construction of its replacement began in 1884, opening to traffic in 1887.

== Gallery ==
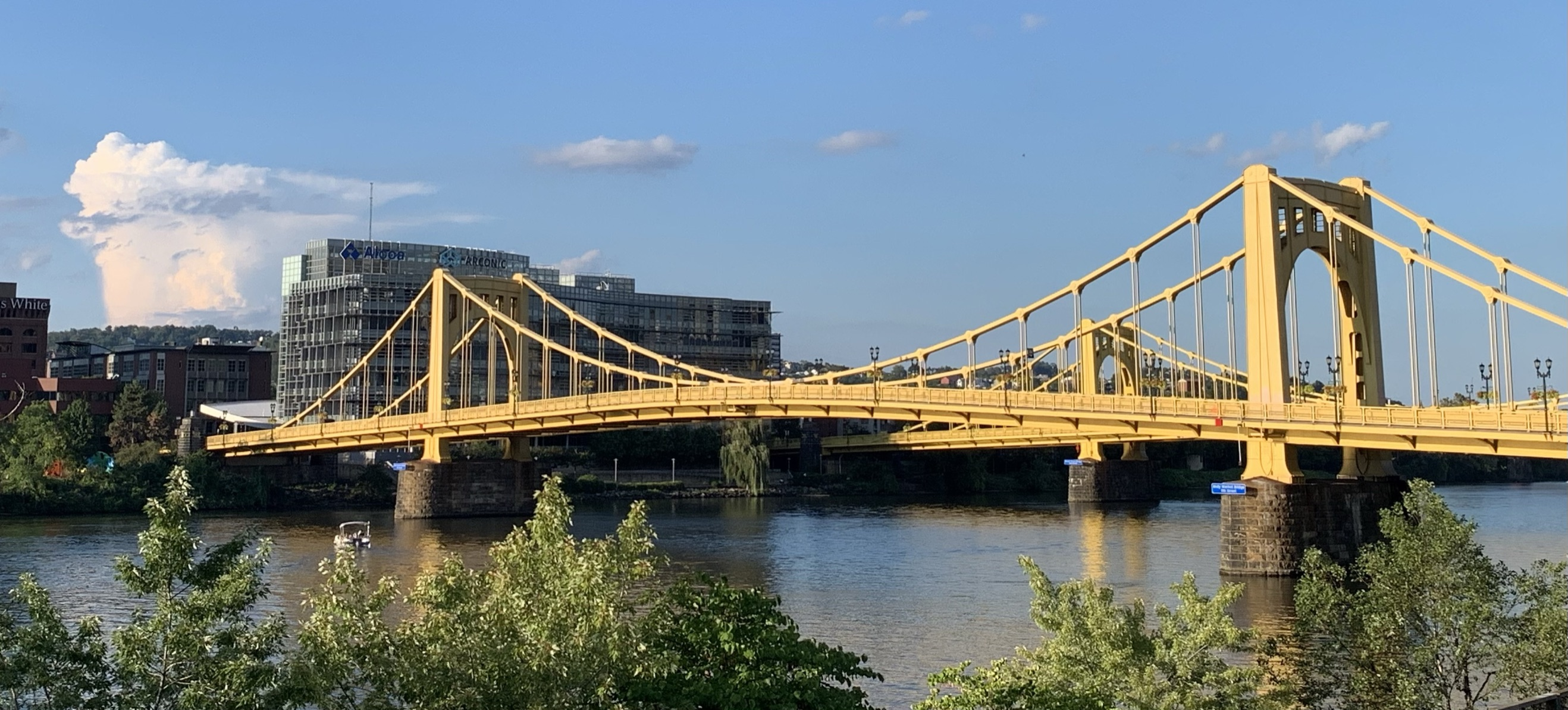
Western side of the bridge

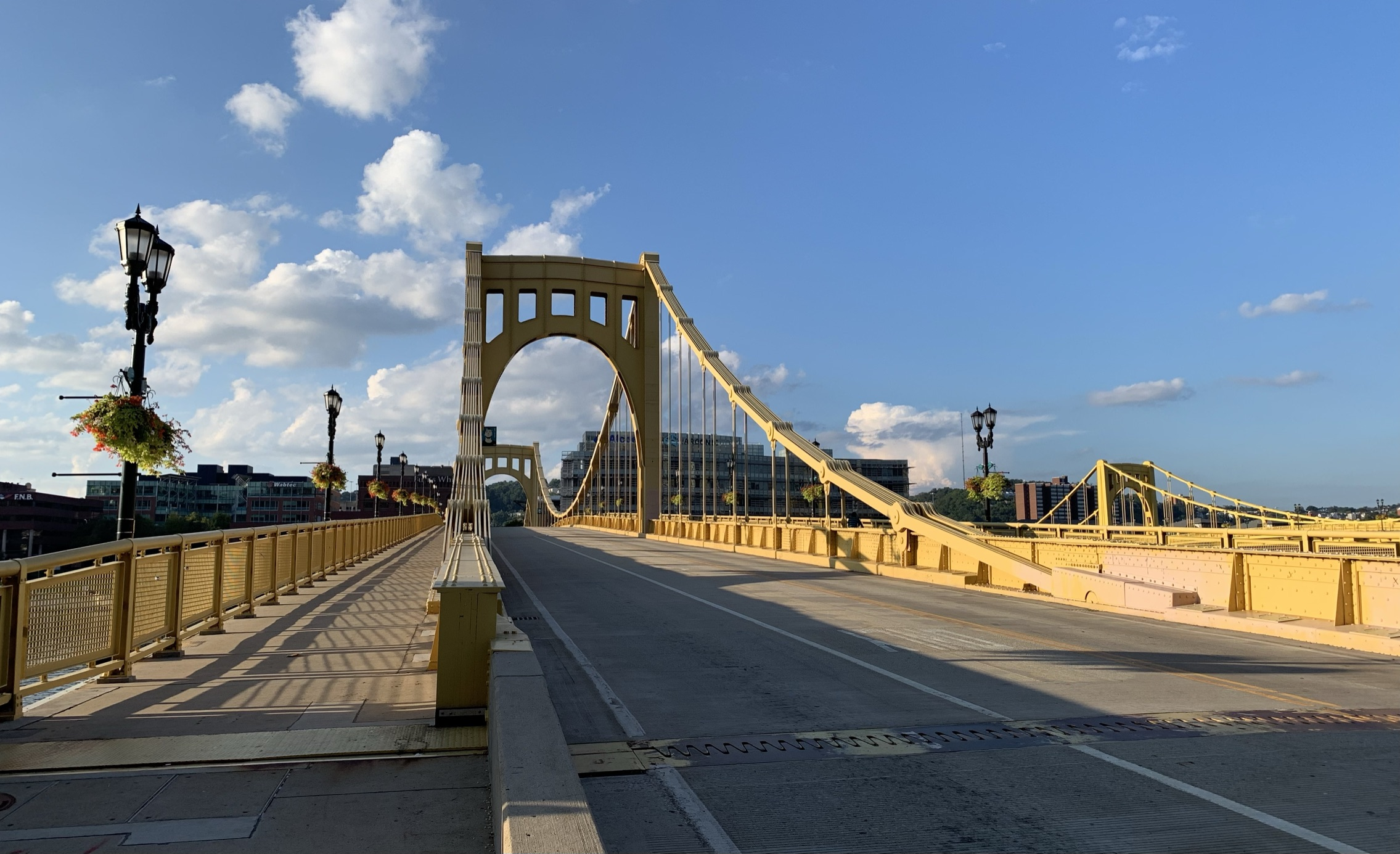
Facing north on the bridge

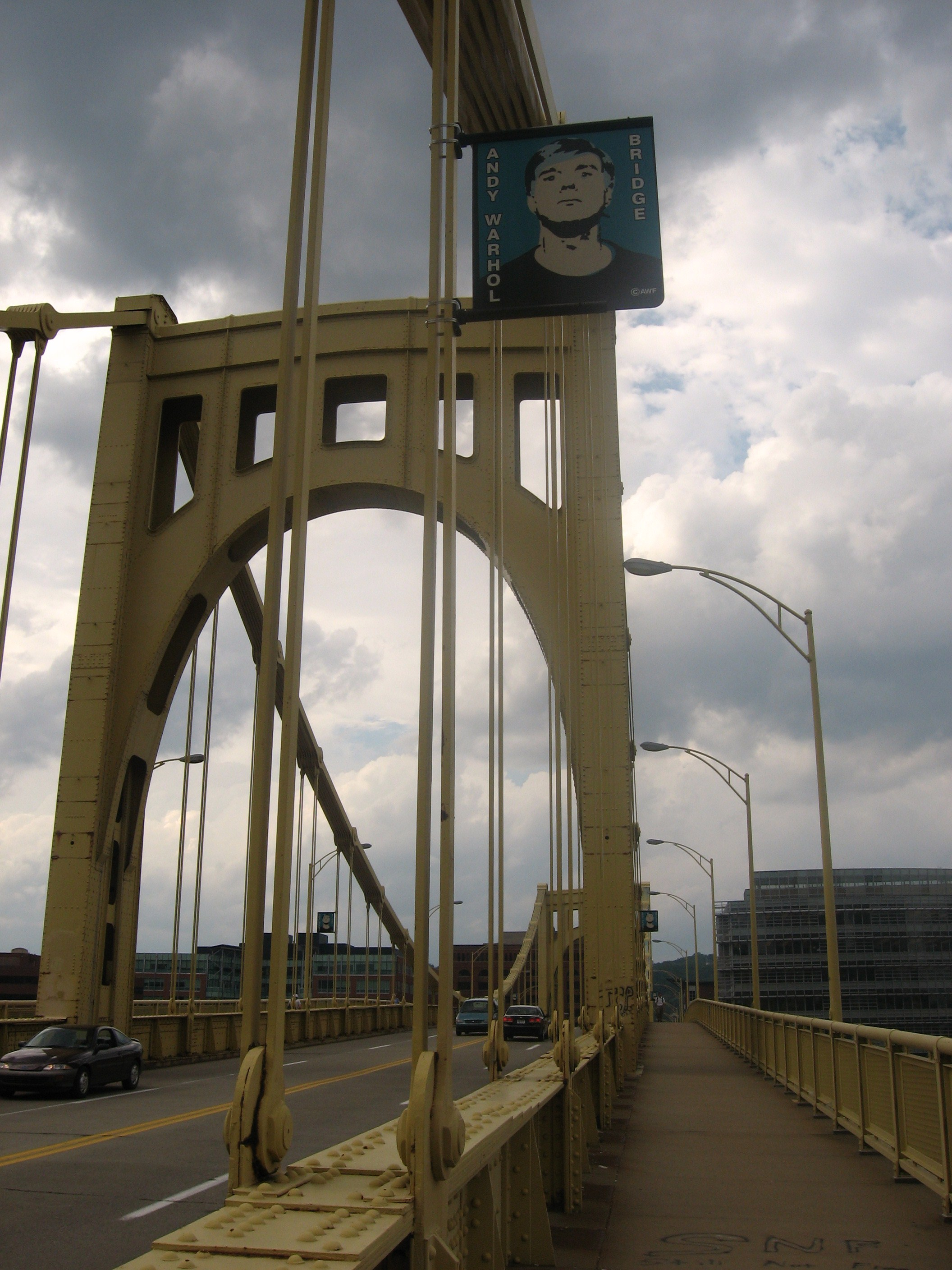
Banner for the bridge's namesake, Andy Warhol

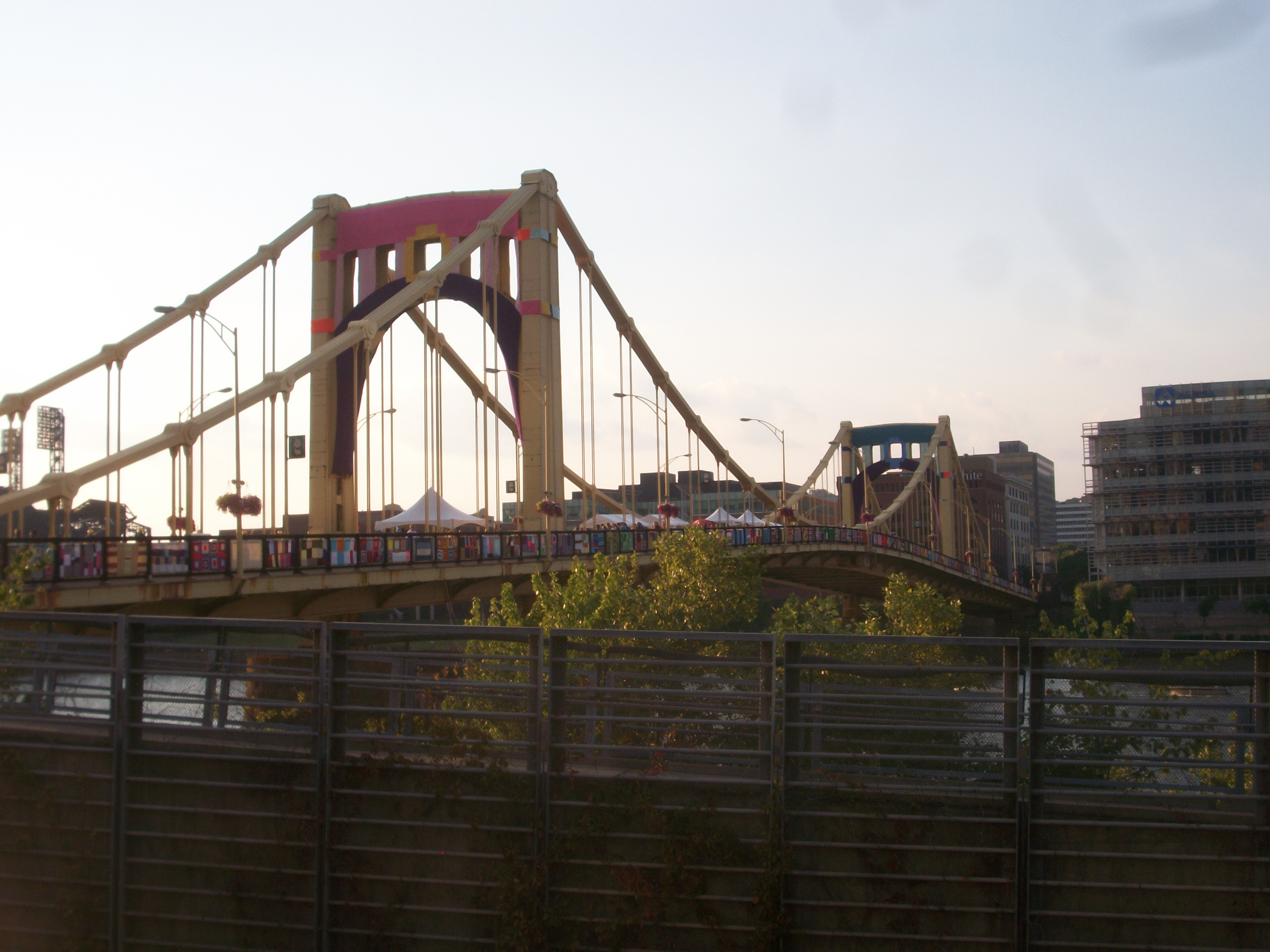
"Knit the Bridge" yarn bombing event on the bridge in August 2013

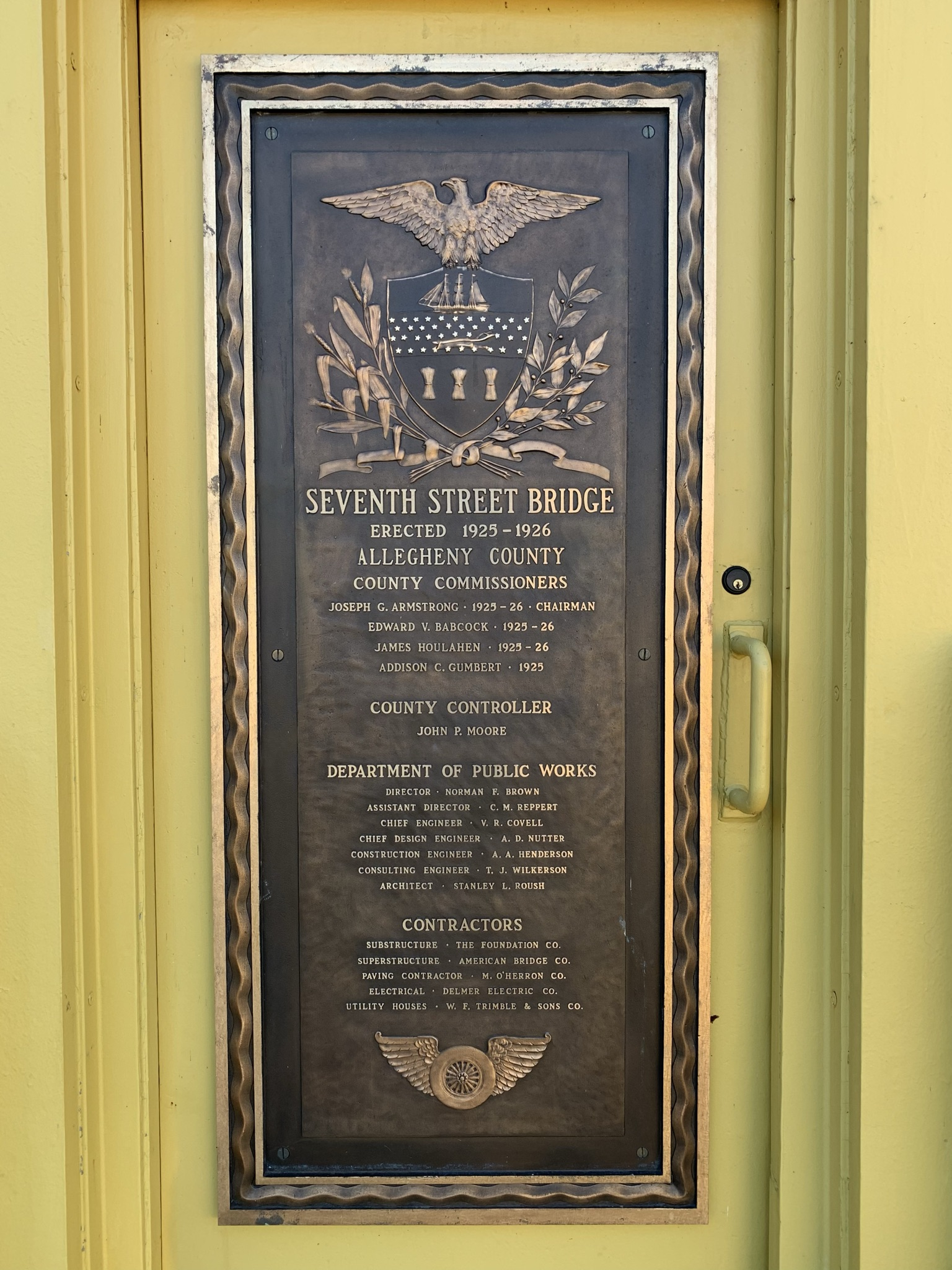
Historic plaque for Seventh Street Bridge

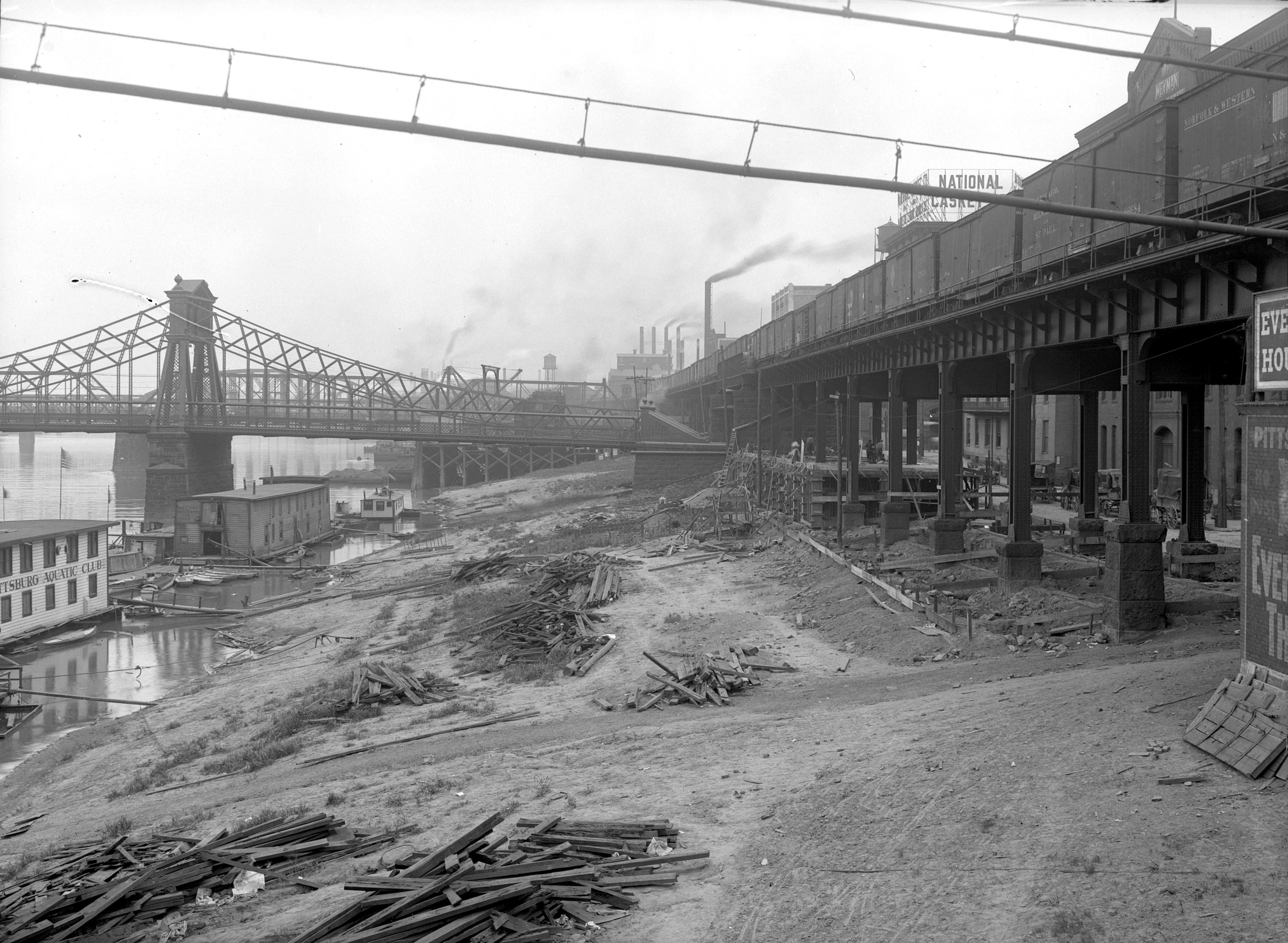
Duquesne Wharf, circa 1912, showing the second Seventh Street Bridge

== See also ==
- List of bridges documented by the Historic American Engineering Record in Pennsylvania
- List of crossings of the Allegheny River
