= Rachel Carson Bridge =

Bridge in Pittsburgh, Pennsylvania, United States

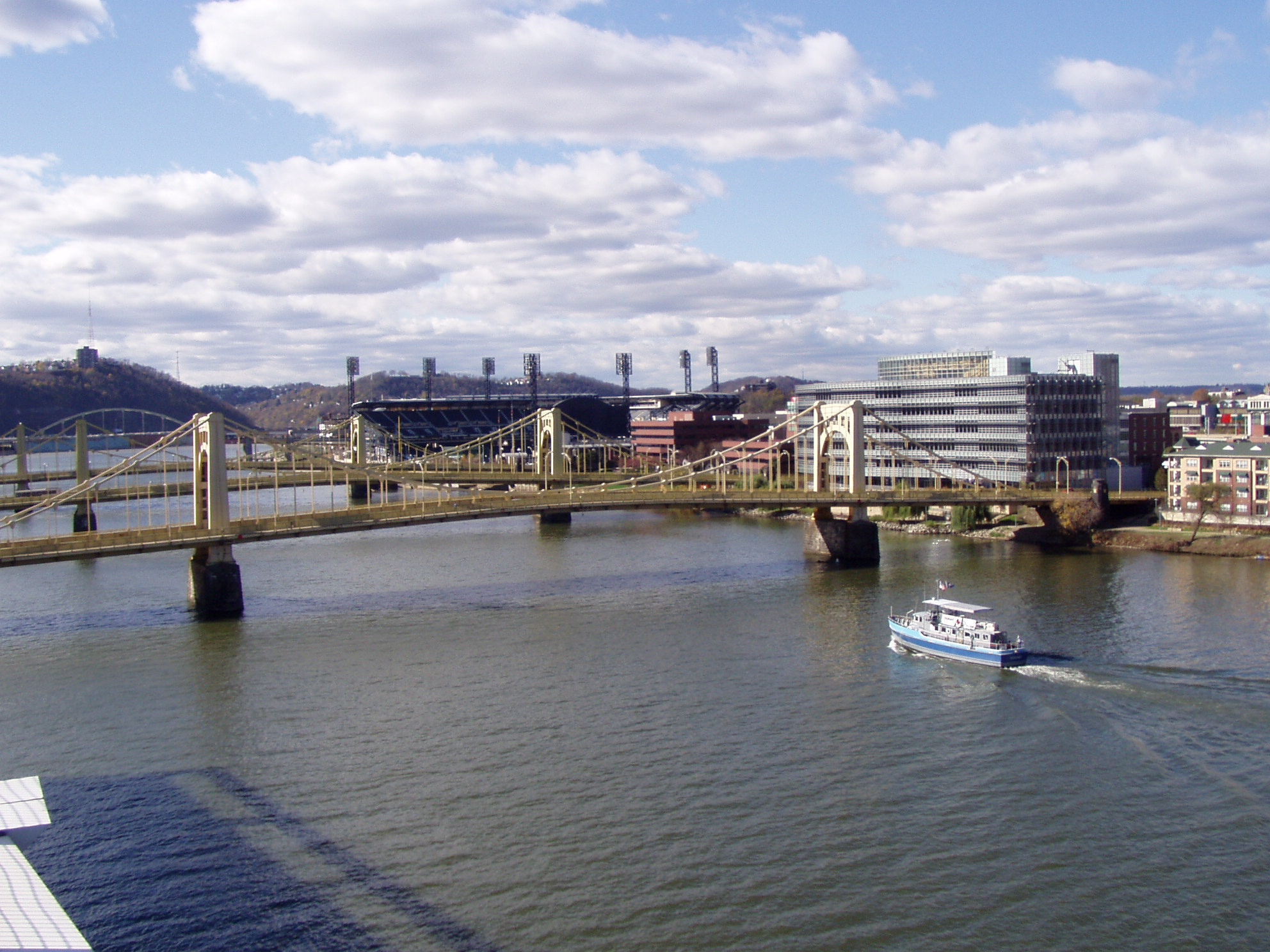
- Rachel Carson Bridge as seen from the roof of the David L. Lawrence Convention Center
- Coordinates: 40.4467°N 79.9998°W
- Carries: Ninth Street
- Official name: Rachel Carson Bridge
- Other name: Ninth Street Bridge

Characteristics
- Total length: 840 ft (260 m) (995 ft (303 m) with approaches)
- Width: 62 ft (19 m)
- Height: 78 ft (24 m)
- Longest span: 410 ft (120 m)
- Clearance below: 40.3 ft (12.3 m) above Emsworth Dam normal pool level (710 ft (220 m) above sea level)

History
- Opened: November 26, 1926; 99 years ago
- Rachel Carson Bridge
- U.S. National Register of Historic Places
- Pittsburgh Landmark – PHLF
- NRHP reference No.: 86000019

Significant dates
- Added to NRHP: January 7, 1986
- Designated PHLF: 1988

Location
- Interactive map of Rachel Carson Bridge

The Rachel Carson Bridge, also known as the Ninth Street Bridge, spans the Allegheny River in Downtown Pittsburgh, Pennsylvania in the United States.

Named for the naturalist and author Rachel Carson, a Pittsburgh native, it is one of three parallel bridges called the Three Sisters, the others being the Roberto Clemente Bridge and the Andy Warhol Bridge. The Three Sisters are self-anchored suspension bridges and are significant because they are the only trio of nearly identical bridges—as well as the first self-anchored suspension spans—built in the United States. All three bridges were built by the American Bridge Company.

The total length of the Rachel Carson Bridge is 840 feet (260 m) including the 410-foot (120 m) main span and two 215-foot (66 m) side spans, or 995 feet (303 m) including the approaches. The total width of the deck is 62 feet (19 m), including the 38-foot (12 m) roadway plus two 10-foot (3.0 m) sidewalks outside the compressive plate girder. Whereas the roadway formerly carried two vehicle lanes and two streetcar tracks, it was changed to carry four wide vehicle lanes. The 2019-2020 refurbishment reduced the lanes to three.

== History ==
The Rachel Carson Bridge was dedicated and opened during a noontime ceremony with Commissioner Babcock, Mayor Kline, and city council members including Herron and McArdle in attendance. The cost of construction was $1.46 million or $26.6 million in 2025 terms.

The bridge was renamed on Earth Day, April 22, 2006, after years of lobbying by Esther Barazzone, president of Chatham University, the alma mater of the renowned environmentalist. Carson was born in 1907 in Springdale, Pennsylvania, in a farmhouse 18 miles (29 km) up the Allegheny River, now the Rachel Carson Homestead.

On February 11, 2019, the bridge was closed to vehicles and pedestrians for a comprehensive rehabilitation project. The bridge was expected to remain closed until at least June 2020. Traffic was detoured over either the Andy Warhol Bridge or the Roberto Clemente Bridge, both of which run parallel and are less than 1/2 mile away from the Rachel Carson Bridge.

The bridge reopened in November 2020 after the completion of a $23.3 million rehabilitation project. It was reconfigured from four lanes to three with the middle lane switching directions midway.

== Image gallery ==
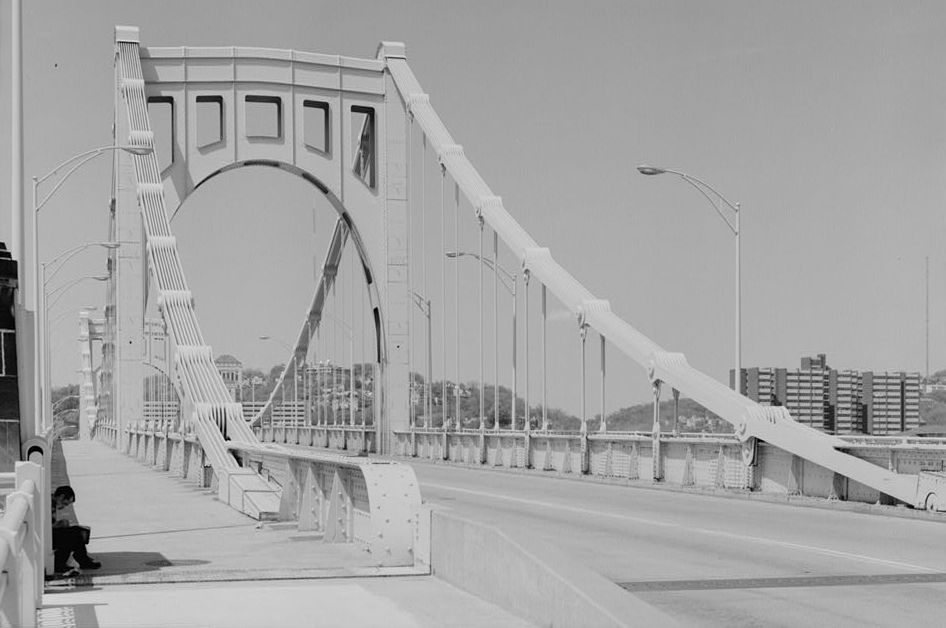
From south bank of the Allegheny, looking NE, oblique view of roadway and south tower, showing eyebar links for main suspenders and roadway suspenders, as well as main compressive stiffening girders dividing roadway from sidewalks

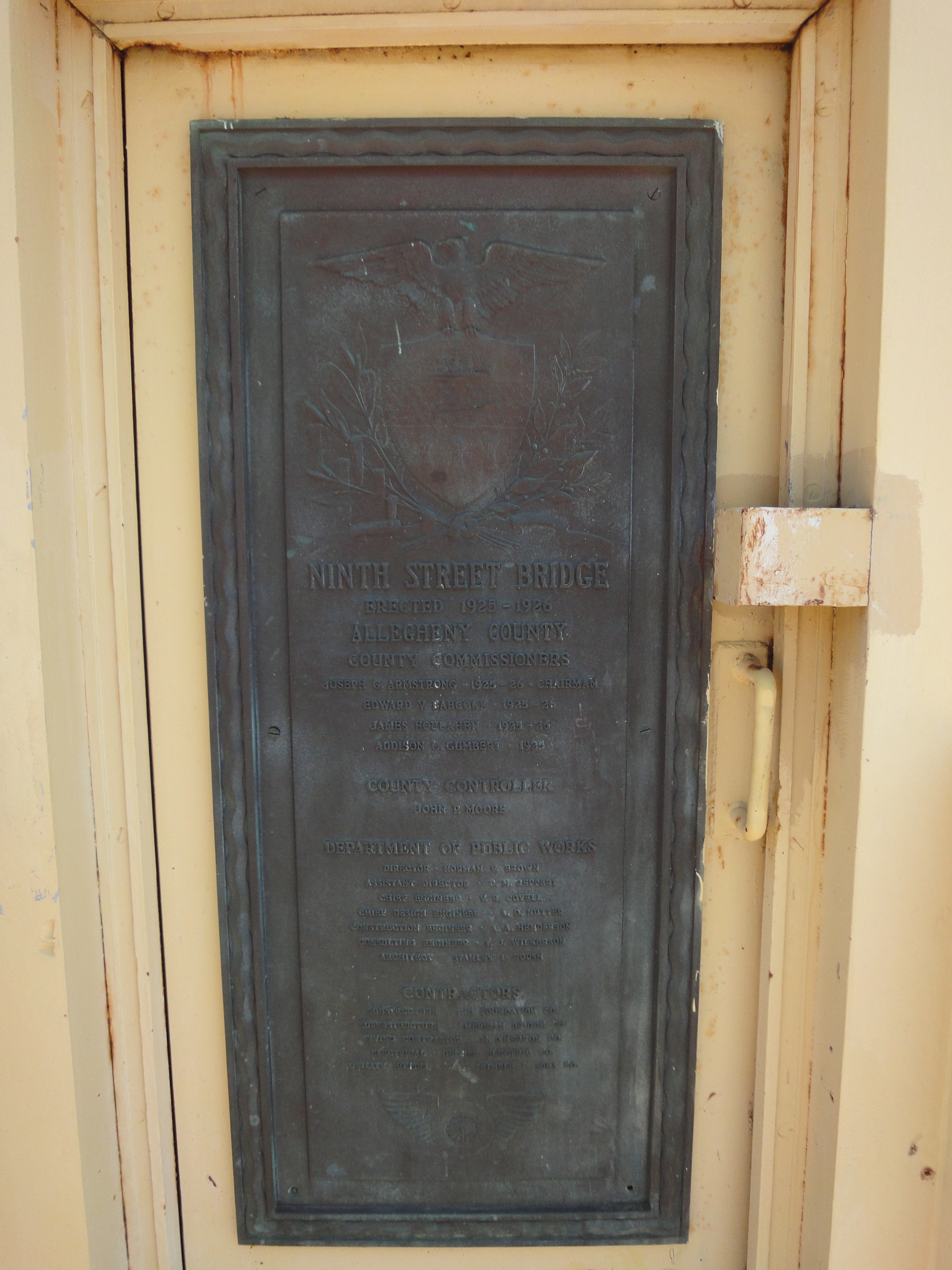
Plaque on North Shore of the Rachel Carson Bridge.

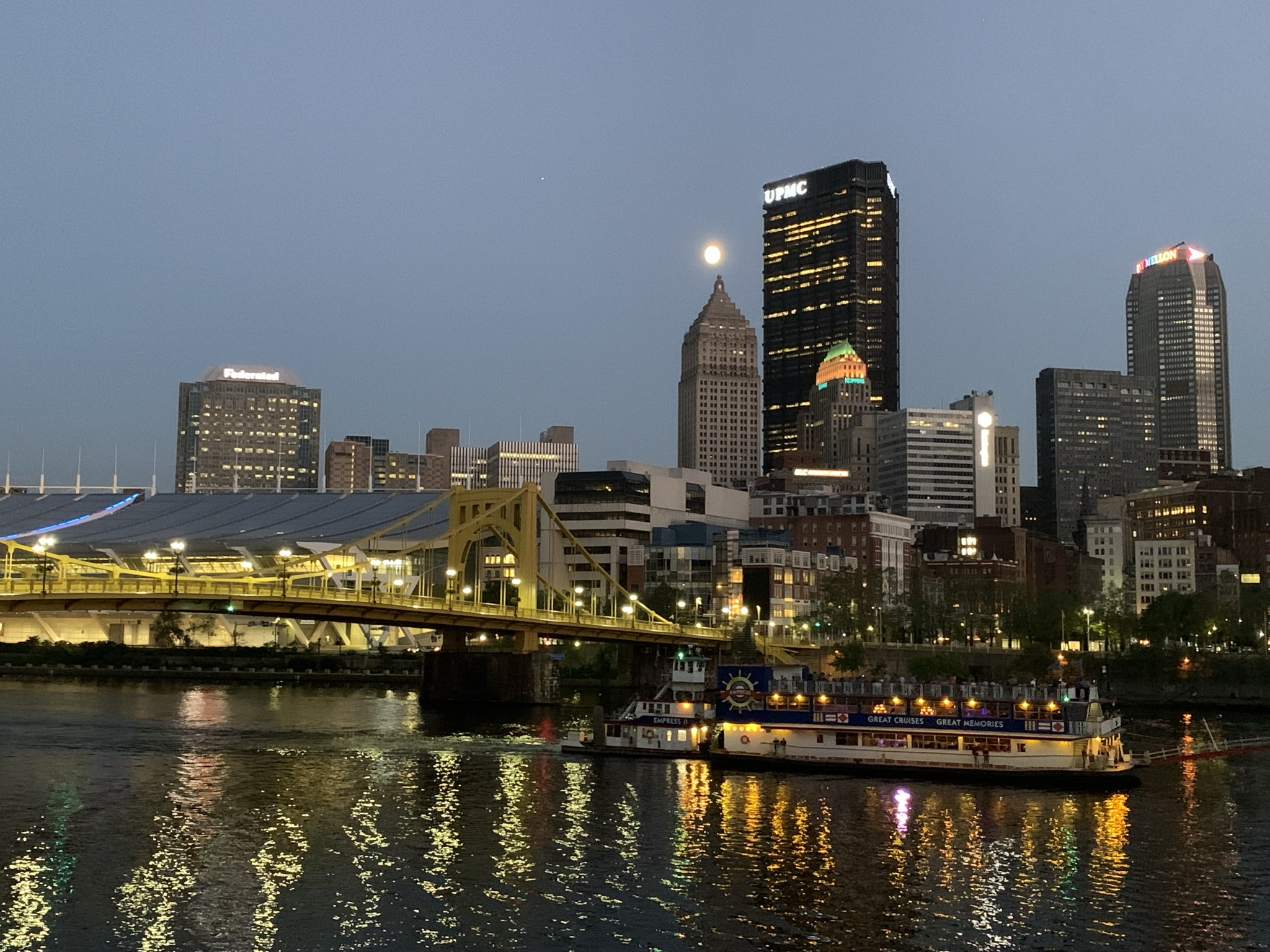
The bridge and Pittsburgh skyline as seen from the North Shore

== See also ==
- List of bridges documented by the Historic American Engineering Record in Pennsylvania
- List of crossings of the Allegheny River
