= Roberto Clemente Memorial Park =

Coordinates: 40.4451°N 80.0119°W

Roberto Clemente Memorial Park is maintained by the Department of Parks and Recreation, City of Pittsburgh, Pennsylvania, in honor of Pittsburgh Pirates great Roberto Clemente. The park is located along North Shore Drive in the city's North Side, near Heinz Field and PNC Park.
