= Emerald View Park =

Municipal park in Pittsburgh, Pennsylvania, US

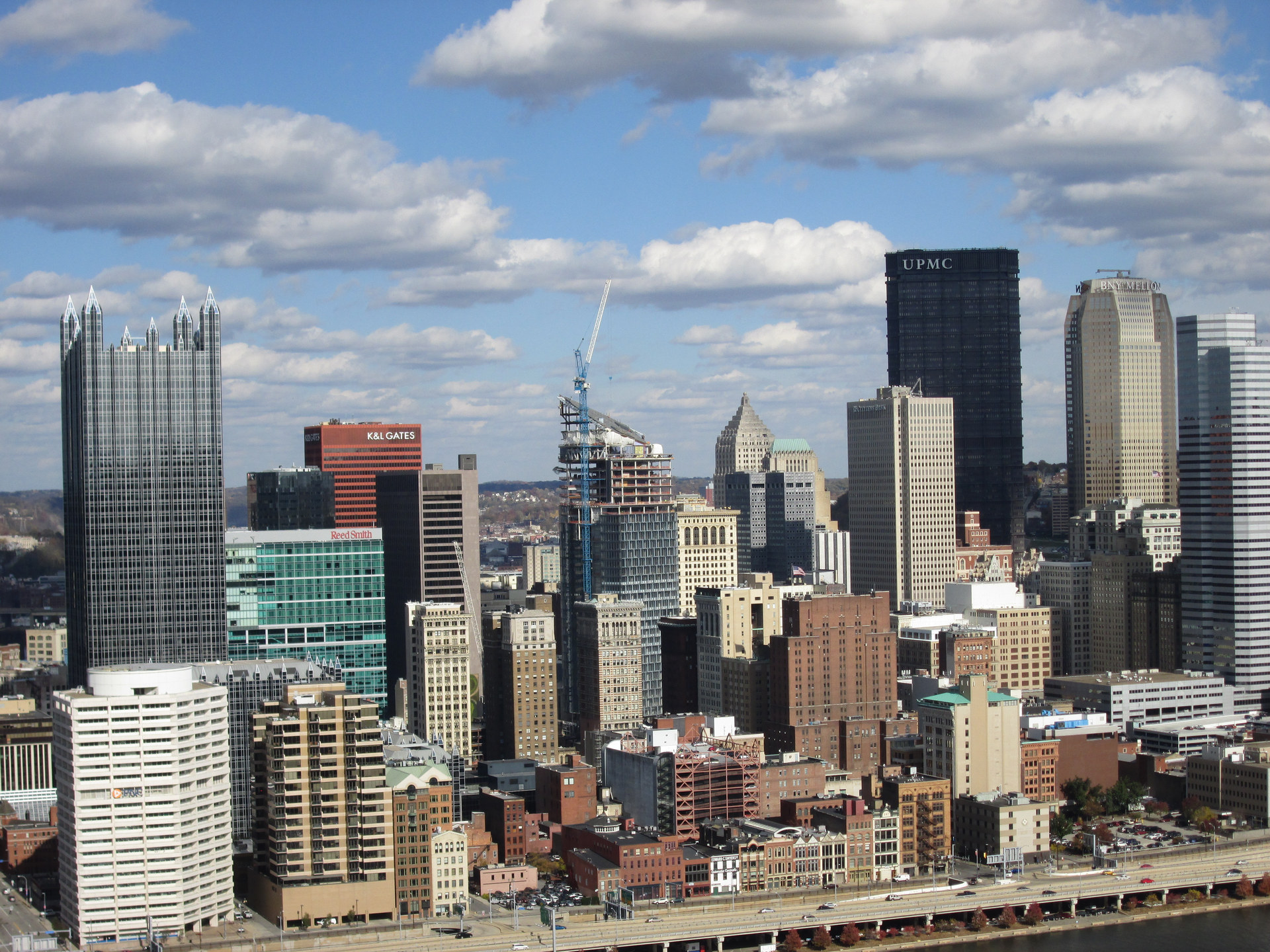
- Famous view of downtown Pittsburgh from Emerald View Park on Mt. Washington
- Interactive map of Emerald View Park
- Type: Park system
- Location: Pittsburgh, Pennsylvania
- Coordinates: 40.42682°N 79.99666°W
- Operator: Mount Washington Community Development Corporation
- Website: mwcdc.org/park/

Emerald View Park (formerly called Grand View Scenic Byway Park) is a large municipal park in Pittsburgh, Pennsylvania. It encircles the neighborhoods of Mt. Washington, Duquesne Heights and Allentown and offers scenic views of the city that draw more than 1.5 million visitors annually.

The park, officially named on Earth Day 2007, is 257 acres (1.04 km^{2}). It joins Frick, Schenley, Highland, and Riverview as the fifth in the city's network of regional parks. Until consolidated in 2006, this land was an assortment of existing smaller parks, greenways, forested hillsides, playing fields, and neglected land parcels. It is jointly managed by the city of Pittsburgh and the neighborhood's community development corporation.

== History ==
In the aftermath of a rare tornado in 1998 that touched down in the neighborhood, the park was conceived by community activists as a way to address the damage. They called themselves "Green Is Good". They feared a post-storm "blighted" designation would spur the city to allow housing and condominium development. Although Mount Washington's vista points are a high-profile attraction, they argued, the true amenity was the continuous 264 acres (1.07 km^{2}) of green, hilly, undeveloped land that rings the Mount. Eventually "Green Is Good" won the support of Mt. Washington Community Development Corporation, other local nonprofits, and the city government.

In 2003, the state designated three Pittsburgh roads—Sycamore Street, McArdle Roadway, and Grandview Avenue—as Pennsylvania Scenic Byways, inspiring the park's very long former name.

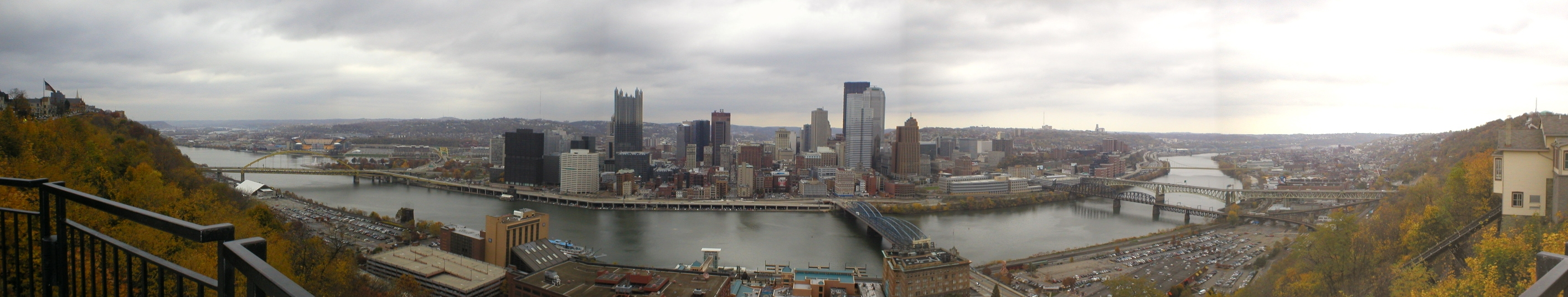
Wide-angle view from Emerald View Park on Mt. Washington
