= Three Sisters (Pittsburgh) =

The Three Sisters
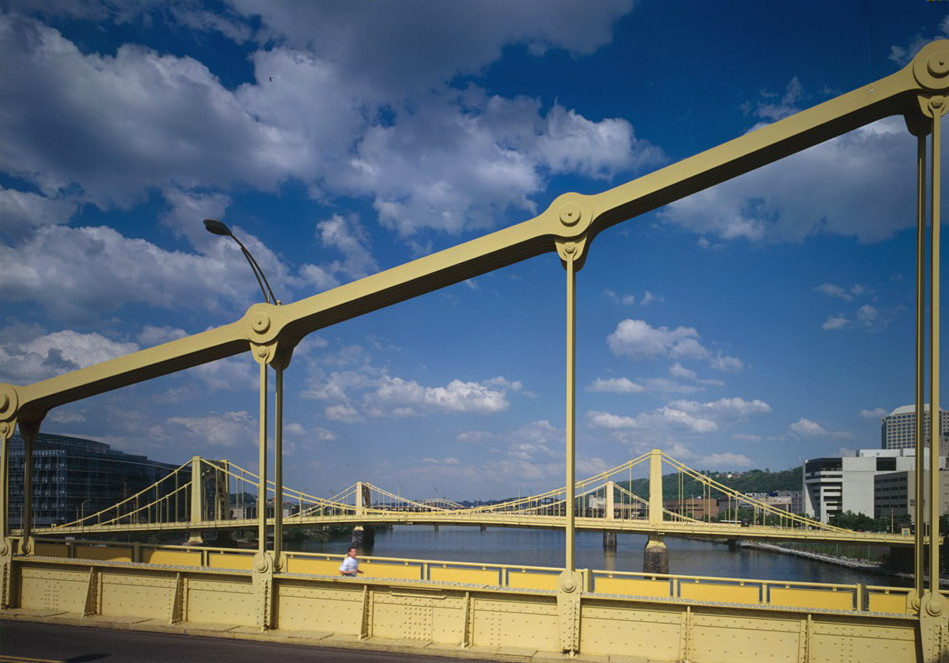
- View of Sixth, Seventh and Ninth Street Bridges from downriver
- Coordinates: 40°26′46″N 80°00′07″W
- Carries: 2 Vehicular lanes, 2 sidewalks
- Crosses: Allegheny River
- Locale: Pittsburgh, Pennsylvania
- Maintained by: Allegheny County

Characteristics
- Design: Self-anchored suspension bridge

Pittsburgh Landmark – PHLF
- Designated: 1988

Sixth Street Bridge
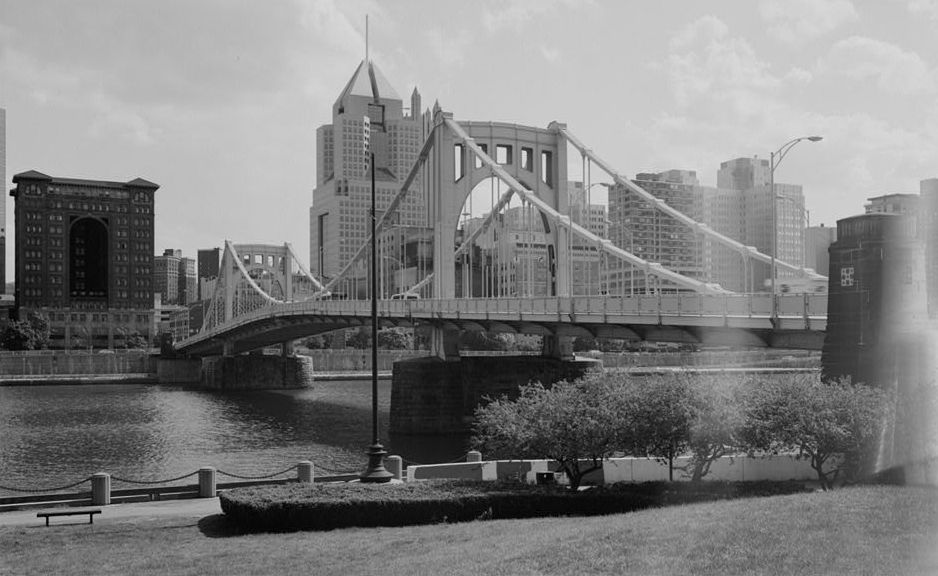
- From north bank of the Allegheny, downtown Pittsburgh in background
- Coordinates: 40°26′43″N 80°00′12″W
- Carries: Sixth Street
- Official name: Roberto Clemente Bridge

Characteristics
- Total length: 884 feet (269 m) in main plus two 215 feet (66 m) side spans; 995 feet (303 m) with approaches
- Width: 38 feet (12 m) roadway (formerly 2 vehicle, 2 tramway tracks, now 2 wide vehicle lanes) with 10 feet (3.0 m) sidewalks outside the plate girders
- Longest span: 430 feet (130 m)
- Clearance above: 78 feet (24 m) towers
- Clearance below: deck is 40 feet (12 m) above Emsworth Dam normal pool level or 710 feet (220 m) above sea level

History
- Opened: October 19, 1928; 96 years ago

The Three Sisters are three similar self-anchored suspension bridges spanning the Allegheny River in downtown Pittsburgh, Pennsylvania at 6th, 7th, and 9th streets, generally running north–south. The bridges have been given formal names to honor important Pittsburgh residents:

- Roberto Clemente (Sixth Street Bridge)
- Andy Warhol (Seventh Street Bridge)
- Rachel Carson (Ninth Street Bridge)

Designed by the Allegheny County Department of Public Works, they were all built in a four-year period, from 1924 to 1928, by the American Bridge Company, replacing earlier bridges of various designs at the same sites. Their construction was mandated by the War Department, citing navigable river clearance concerns. They are constructed of steel, and use steel eyebars in lieu of cables.

The Three Sisters are historically significant because they are the only trio of nearly identical bridges, as well as the first self-anchored suspension spans, built in the United States. They are among the only surviving examples of large eyebar chain suspension bridges in America, and furthermore, unusual for their self-anchoring designs. The bridges’ design was viewed as a creative response to the political, commercial, and aesthetic concerns of Pittsburgh in the 1920s.

The bridges were designed under the auspices of the Allegheny County Department of Public Works, by T. J. Wilkerson, consulting engineer; Vernon R. Covell, chief engineer; A. D. Nutter, design engineer; and Stanley L. Roush, architect. The American Bridge Company built the superstructure, while the Foundation Company built the substructure. All three bridges are owned by Allegheny County.

== History ==
From 1926 through 1931, four suspension bridges were constructed across the Allegheny and Monongahela Rivers. The fourth bridge (not covered in this article) is a wire cable bridge carrying South Tenth Street across the Monongahela.

The "Three Sisters Bridges" represent an adaptive engineering design response to political and technical concerns. County engineers successfully overcame challenges presented by federally mandated clearances, aesthetic and financial considerations raised by local agencies, and the lack of adequate anchorage points along the river banks. They were the first self-anchored suspension bridges built in the United States. The design’s solid plate deck-stiffening girder provided compressive support while lowering visual barriers between Pittsburgh and the historically distinct North side (formerly Allegheny City), annexed in 1907 in a contentious fight.

The American Bridge Company, the builder and steel supplier for these three bridges, was headquartered nearby, as was the Foundation Company that had the pier/abutment masonry contract. Local election campaigns during the period highlighted the intent to use local suppliers and labor.

=== Engineering background ===
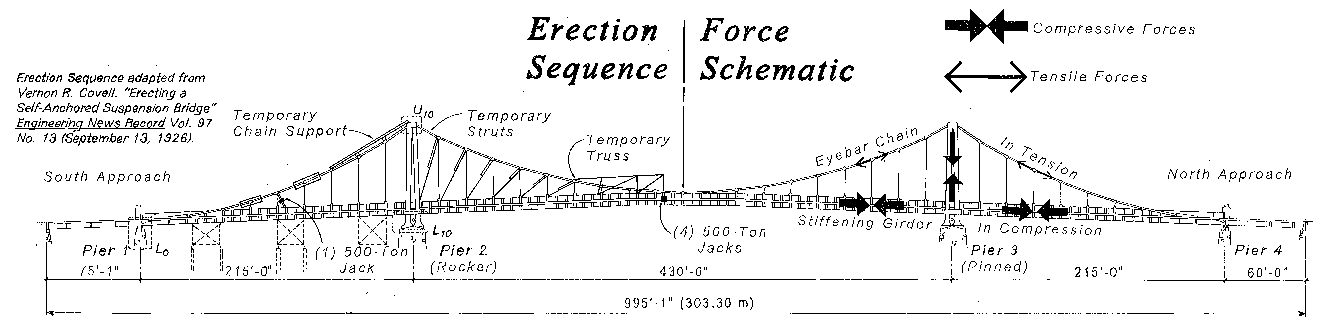
A portion of the Erection Sequence and Force Diagram for the bridges, produced by the Historic American Engineering Record in the 1990s. The full diagram includes the following text:

Seventh Street Bridge
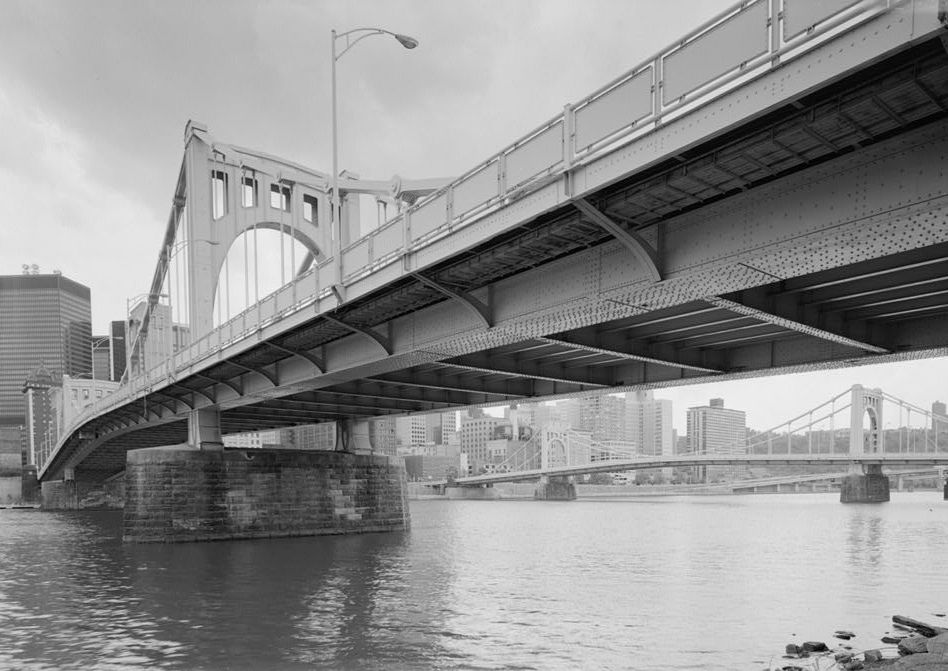
- From north bank of the Allegheny, looking SW, downtown Pittsburgh in background, Sixth Street Bridge at right. Shows main plate girder (bearing compressive forces) and sidewalk support
- Coordinates: 40°26′45″N 80°00′05″W
- Carries: Seventh Street
- Official name: Andy Warhol Bridge

Characteristics
- Total length: 884 feet (269 m) in main plus two 221 feet (67 m) side spans; 1,061 feet (323 m) with approaches
- Width: 38 ft roadway (formerly 2 vehicle, 2 tramway tracks, now 2 wide vehicle lanes) with 10 feet (3.0 m) sidewalks outside the plate girders; total 62 feet (19 m)
- Longest span: 442 feet (135 m)
- Clearance above: 83.5 feet (25.5 m) towers
- Clearance below: deck is 40.1 feet (12.2 m) above Emsworth Dam normal pool level or 710 feet (220 m) above sea level

History
- Opened: June 17, 1926; 98 years ago

A suspension bridge works by hanging a roadway from cables or chains under tension. Though a few unstiffened suspension bridges exist, a longitudinal stiffening truss or girder is usually added to prevent excessive movement of the deck. The cables pass over towers and are anchored at both ends. Conventional suspension bridges use massive concrete or rock anchorages to resist the cable’s tension. In self-anchored suspension bridges, however, the cables are fastened to both ends of the longitudinal girders. These girders are therefore compression struts in addition to stiffening the roadway.

Because each of Pittsburgh's Three Sisters appears to be a self-contained unit not dependent on the river banks for anchorage, a debate ensued among engineers whether these structures were cantilevers rather than suspension bridges. Current wisdom holds them to be the latter. Each bridge was built in halves toward the center, with temporary diagonal struts placed between chain and deck to provide shear resistance. These struts temporarily turned each incomplete half into a trussed cantilever arm. The struts 'freed themselves' when the tension on them was removed by jacking each half and connecting them together to form a suspension bridge.

Ninth Street Bridge
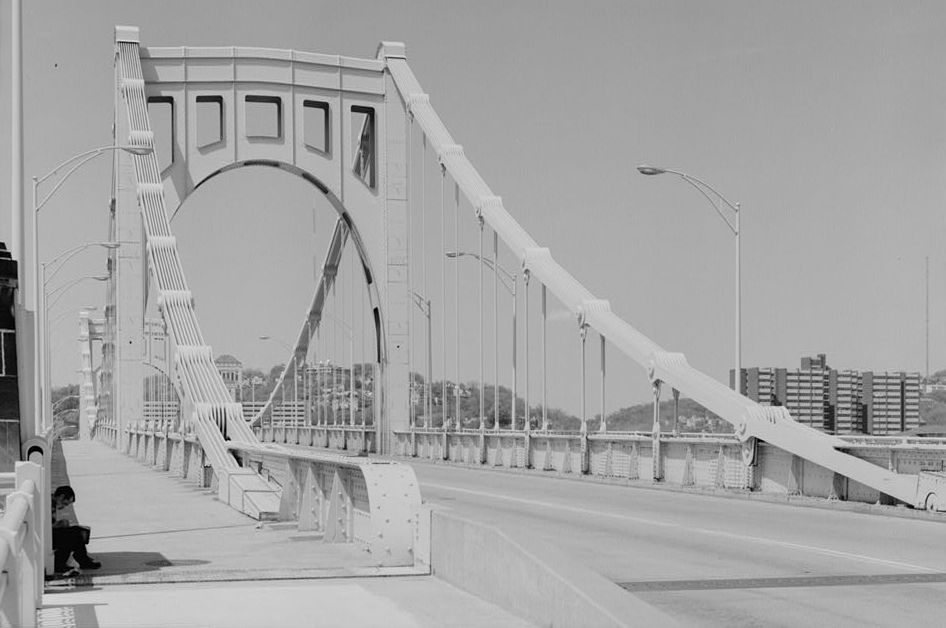
- From south bank of the Allegheny, looking NE, oblique view of roadway and south tower, showing eyebar links for main suspenders and roadway suspenders, as well as solid plate main compressive stiffening girders dividing roadway from sidewalks
- Coordinates: 40°26′47″N 79°59′59″W
- Carries: Ninth Street
- Official name: Rachel Carson Bridge

Characteristics
- Total length: 840 feet (260 m) in main plus two 215 feet (66 m) side spans; 995 feet (303 m) with approaches
- Width: 38 feet (12 m) roadway (formerly 2 vehicle, 2 tramway tracks, now 2 wide vehicle lanes) with 10 feet (3.0 m) sidewalks (outside the plate girders; total 62 feet (19 m)
- Longest span: 410 feet (120 m)
- Clearance above: 78 feet (24 m) towers
- Clearance below: deck is 40.3 feet (12.3 m) above Emsworth Dam normal pool level or 710 feet (220 m) above sea level

History
- Opened: November 26, 1926; 98 years ago

=== Political background ===
A driving force for the three bridges all being constructed at once was that the predecessor bridges were all out of compliance with War Department standards for minimum width and clearance over channels for bridges crossing navigable waters such as the Ohio, the Allegheny, and the Monongahela.

The previous bridges were all owned by private companies established to build bridges and pay them off through toll collection. The bridges were quite profitable, with several of the companies in the area paying 15% dividends yearly to stock holders, even with tolls at 1 cent per man and free for women.

Some controversy ensued over whether public entities could take bridges or bridge rights of way away from private companies if the companies had already retired their construction loans.

At some point, the public supported a "free bridges" movement that supported government buying out the bridge companies and abolishing tolls. Between that and the War department ruling that government-owned bridges would not need to be corrected as quickly, the bridge companies were willing to sell and did so before 1910. The County (rather than City or State) bought the companies out at fair market value.

Thus the county had to deal with the problem of non compliance when the war department raised it again at the end of the 1910s. Through the teens and early 20s bond issues were floated before the voters to finance replacement but repeatedly failed, in part because voters of the time saw public works as a source of corruption, especially at the county level.

In 1924, voters finally approved a $29.2 million bond issue at the county level to improve bridges and municipal structures. Several proposals were made for lift bridges of various sorts, including a scheme to raise an existing bridge on mechanical jacks, but the War Department did not approve, insisting on a failure proof means of clearance. The Seventh Street Bridge was razed in 1924, and the War Department forced the razing of the 9th as well, despite the inconvenience to the city.

After much design work, two truss bridges at 6th and 9th and a cantilever bridge at 7th were approved, and submitted to the Metropolitan Art Commission, a forgotten body that had approval rights for any bridge over $25,000 in the City of Pittsburgh. Expecting a rubber stamp, contracts were let, but to everyone's shock the commission vetoed the designs as unaesthetic, preferring suspension bridges. But shoreline clearances were tight and two of the older suspension bridges had experienced problems with insecure anchorages. It is not clear who suggested a self-anchoring suspension bridge design, as the only precedent known at that time was a 1915 bridge over the Rhine at Cologne the Deutzer Hängebrücke.

However, by 1922 one of the better known advisors on cantilever and suspension bridge structures noted the peculiar strengths represented in the Cologne bridge’s design. David B. Steinman’s running dispute with J. A. L. Waddell about the relative costs of suspension and cantilever bridges continued a debate with roots in the Quebec Bridge collapse. That 1907 construction disaster, accompanied by the 1916 accident during a second attempt, heightened a growing preference for suspension bridges. In light of the popular and engineering support for suspension structures, Steinman’s first edition of A Practical Treatise on Suspension Bridges fed a growing demand for technical information about components such as eye-bars and stiffening systems. Steinman’s reputation and the fact that his book was reviewed in the engineering press make it likely that Allegheny County’s engineers could have examined the first edition of this book.

== See also ==
- List of bridges documented by the Historic American Engineering Record in Pennsylvania
- List of crossings of the Allegheny River
- Coraopolis Bridge
- The Triplets bridges
