= Roberto Clemente Bridge =

Bridge in Pittsburgh, Pennsylvania, United States

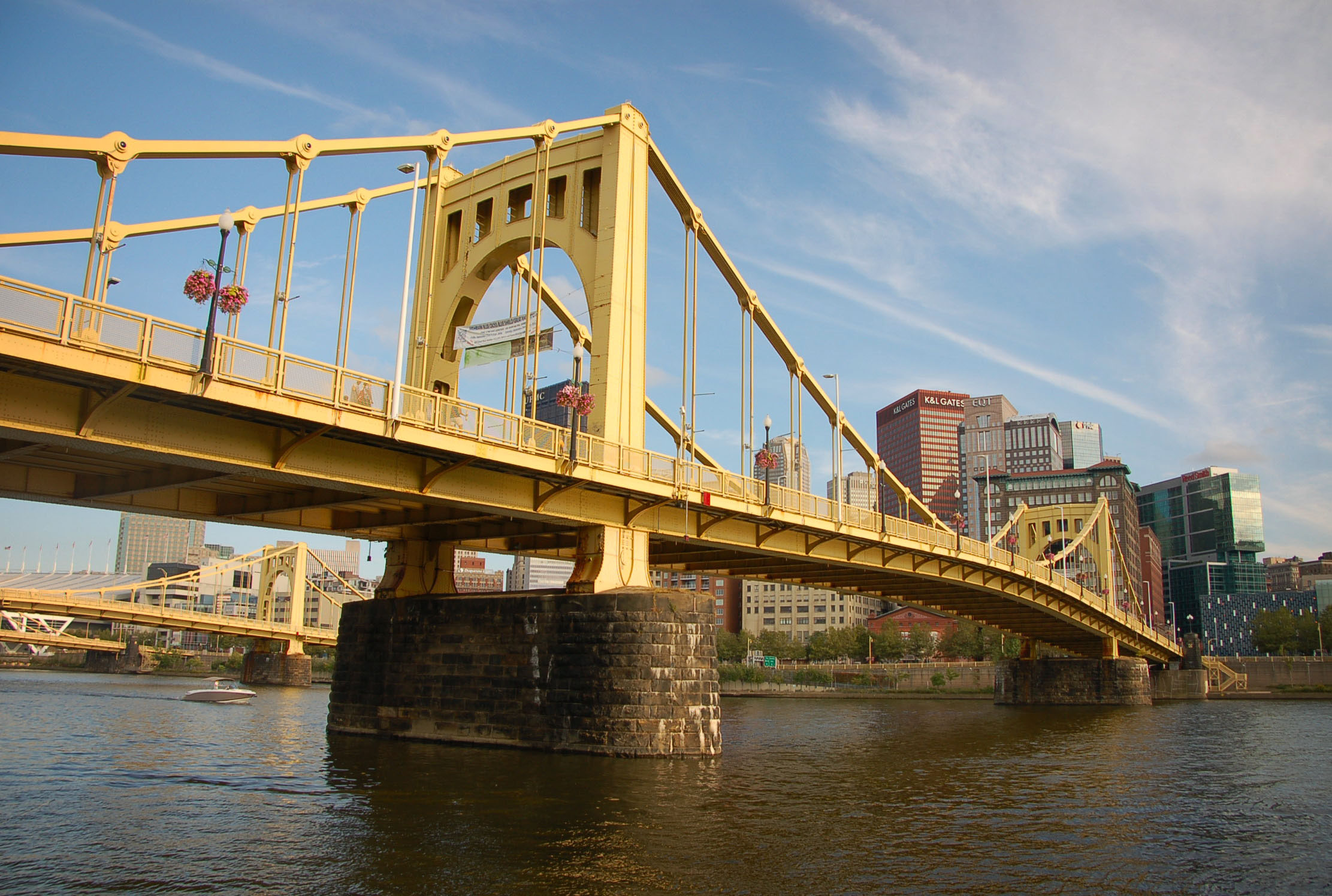
- The Bridge with Downtown Pittsburgh in the background.
- Coordinates: 40°26′44.1594″N 80°0′11.8794″W
- Carries: Sixth Street
- Crosses: Allegheny River
- Locale: Allegheny, Pennsylvania, United States
- Official name: Roberto Clemente Bridge
- Other name: Sixth Street Bridge
- Named for: Roberto Clemente
- Maintained by: Allegheny County

Characteristics
- Design: Suspension bridge
- Total length: 884 ft (269 m)
- Height: 78 ft (24 m)
- No. of spans: 3
- Roberto Clemente Bridge
- U.S. National Register of Historic Places
- Pittsburgh Landmark – PHLF
- NRHP reference No.: 86000017

Significant dates
- Added to NRHP: January 7, 1986
- Designated PHLF: 1988

Location
- Interactive map of Roberto Clemente Bridge

The Roberto Clemente Bridge, also known as the Sixth Street Bridge, spans the Allegheny River in downtown Pittsburgh, Pennsylvania, United States.

== History ==
=== First bridge ===
The original bridge at the site was a wooden covered bridge with six spans, probably using Burr trusses. It was built in 1819 by a contractor named Lothrop.

=== Second bridge ===
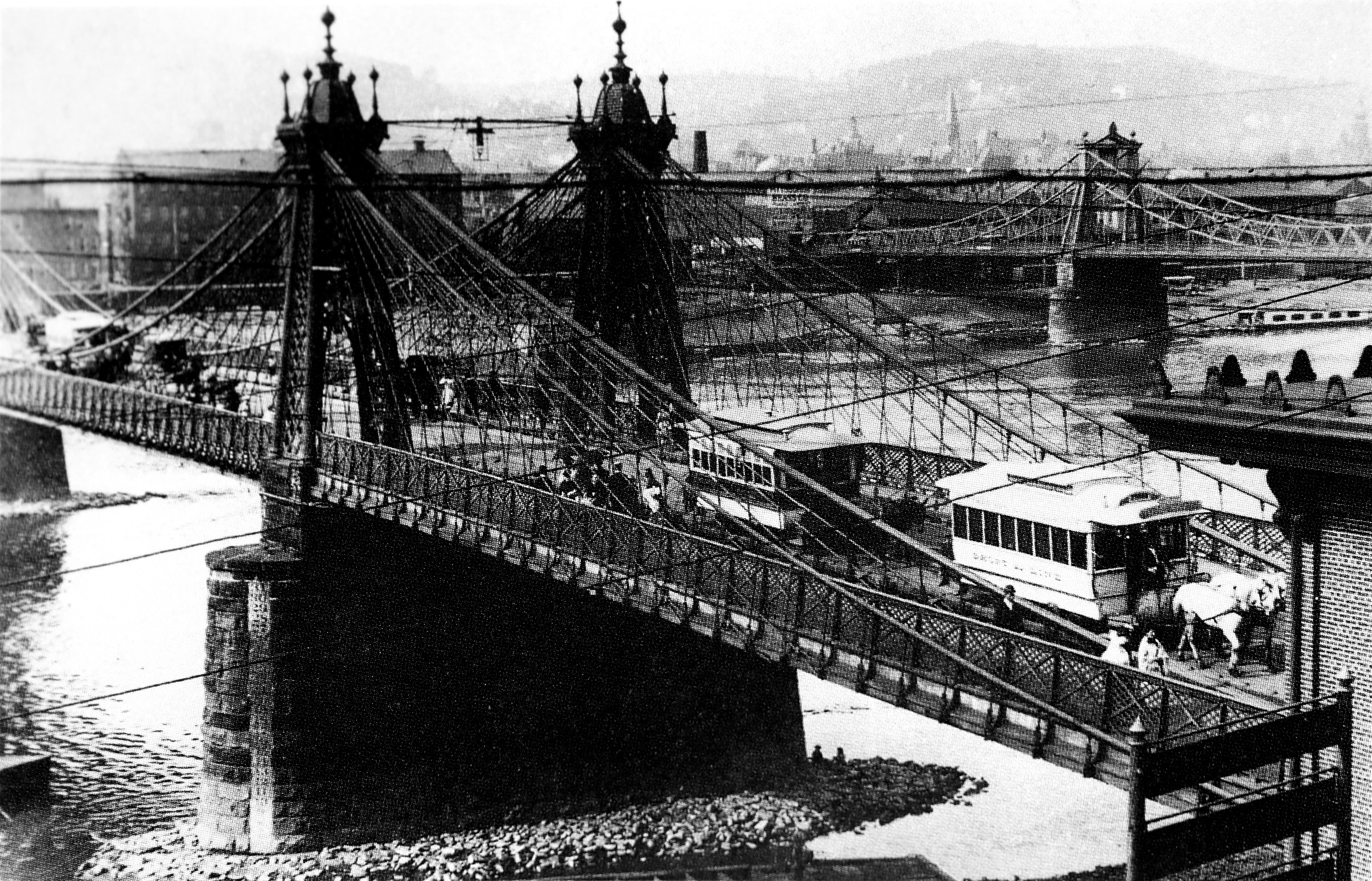
Roebling's second version (1859) of the Sixth Street Bridge.

In 1859, the second Sixth Street Bridge was built by John A. Roebling. This was his third and final bridge in Pittsburgh. His eldest son Washington Roebling worked with him on the bridge after completing his degree in engineering.

This bridge had two main spans of 343 feet (105 m), with shore spans of 179 feet (55 m). The floors were suspended from wire hangers, which were suspended from wire catenaries. This bridge was demolished in 1892, as it was too narrow and fragile to support modern transportation demands.

=== Third bridge ===
In 1892, the third Sixth Street Bridge was built by engineer Theodore Cooper for the Union Bridge Company. The main spans were 440 feet (130 m) long, each having through trusses of the camel-back type with upward-angled upper chords. The spans were twice as wide as the previous bridge.

In 1927 the bridge had to be taken apart because the steelwork was too brittle for safety. That year, the main spans were somewhat trimmed down temporarily from their 80-foot (24 m) height. They were lowered onto barges and floated down the Ohio River to the back channel of Neville Island, where they were used as part of the Coraopolis Bridge. Finally, in 1994 the steel was scrapped.

=== Current bridge ===
The current bridge was completed on September 29, 1928. It is one of the Three Sisters bridges, which include the 7th and 9th Street bridges. The three bridges are nearly identical self-anchored, eye-bar suspension types. The horizontal pull of the top cords is resisted by the steel girders along each side of the roadway. The suspension system consists of 14" eye-bars extending from end to end, having two pins on the top of each tower and carrying the roadway by 4" eye-bar suspenders at the panel points. The stiffening system consists of triple web-plate girders parallel to the road grade. The girders are subjected to stresses due to bending combined with direct compression.

All three bridges were fabricated and erected by American Bridge (AB). In an innovative approach, AB temporarily turned the eye-bar catenary/deck girder system into a truss by adding a diagonal to enable erection by a balanced cantilever. This avoided falsework in the river.

== Significance ==
Named for the Pittsburgh Pirates baseball player Roberto Clemente, it is one of three parallel bridges called The Three Sisters. The Three Sisters are self-anchored suspension bridges and are significant because they are the only trio of nearly identical bridges—as well as the first self-anchored suspension spans—built in the United States. Over 720 bridges link the city districts.

The Sixth Street Bridge's piers were built with arched openings beneath the river bed to accommodate future subway tunnels, following the recommendation of transportation planner Bion J. Arnold. The North Shore Connector tunnels completed in 2012 did not make use of this provision but were bored further west (downstream) and did not pass beneath the bridge.

The bridge was formally renamed on August 6, 1998 after Clemente, who played his entire career with the Pirates and was killed in a 1972 plane crash. This was part of a compromise after the Pirates sold the naming rights to PNC Park to locally based PNC Financial Services. Before the naming rights were sold, Pittsburgh's popular sentiment was to name the park itself after Clemente.

It is closed to vehicular traffic on Pirates' game days, providing a pedestrian route to PNC Park. When PNC Park was built, a statue of Roberto Clemente, erected initially at Three Rivers Stadium, was placed at the southeast corner of the park, right at the north anchorage of the Roberto Clemente Bridge.

The Pittsburgh History and Landmarks Foundation, in cooperation with the Riverlife Task Force, the City of Pittsburgh, and Duquesne Light Company, funded and managed the architectural lighting of the bridge. On November 20, 2002, the bridge was lit for the first time.

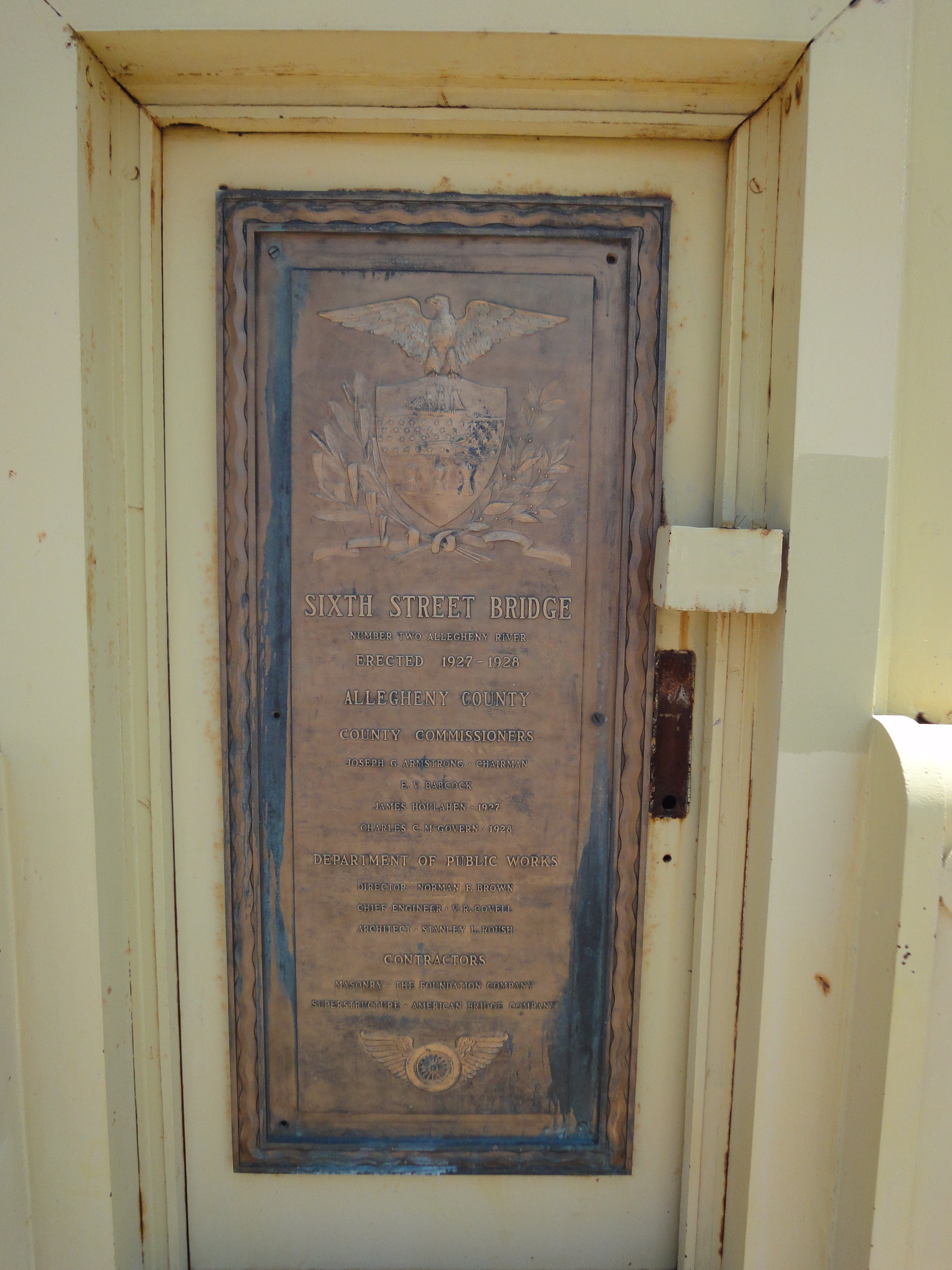
Plaque on the North Shore of the Sixth Street Bridge.

== See also ==
- List of bridges documented by the Historic American Engineering Record in Pennsylvania
- List of crossings of the Allegheny River
